= List of endemic plants of Socotra =

Socotra is the largest island in the Socotra Archipelago, which also includes Abd al Kuri, Samhah, and Darsah. The islands are in the Indian Ocean east of the Horn of Africa and south of the Arabian Peninsula. The archipelago is home to dozens of endemic species and subspecies of plants, including the endemic genera Angkalanthus, Ballochia, Cephalocrotonopsis, Cyanixia, Duvaliandra, Haya, Lachnocapsa, Nirarathamnos, Paraerva, Socotrella, Tamridaea, and Trichocalyx. Although it is politically part of Yemen, the World Geographical Scheme for Recording Plant Distributions treats the Socotra Archipelago as a separate botanical country.

Plants are listed alphabetically by plant family.

== Acanthaceae ==
- Angkalanthus Balf.f.
  - Angkalanthus oligophylla Balf.f. – south-central Socotra
- Anisotes diversifolius Balf.f. – Socotra
- Ballochia Balf.f. – Socotra
  - Ballochia amoena Balf.f. – Socotra
  - Ballochia atrovirgata Balf.f. – Socotra
  - Ballochia rotundifolia Balf.f. – north-central and southwestern Socotra
- Barleria aculeata Balf.f. – Socotra
- Barleria popovii Verdc. – – Socotra (central Hajhir Mts.)
- Barleria tetracantha Balf.f. – Socotra
- Blepharis spiculifolia Balf.f. – northeastern Socotra
- Chorisochora minor (Balf.f.) Vollesen – north-central Socotra
- Chorisochora striata (Balf.f.) Vollesen – Socotra
- Dicliptera effusa Balf.f. – Socotra
- Hypoestes pubescens Balf.f. – Socotra
- Justicia alexandri R.Atk. – north-central Socotra
- Justicia rigida Balf.f. – Socotra
- Justicia takhinensis R.Atk. – northeastern Socotra
- Neuracanthus aculeatus Balf.f. – northeastern Socotra
- Ruellia dioscoridis Napper – Socotra
- Ruellia insignis Balf.f. – north-central Socotra
- Ruellia kuriensis Vierh. – central Abd al Kuri
- Ruellia paulayana Vierh. – southeastern Socotra
- Trichocalyx Balf.f. – Socotra
  - Trichocalyx obovatus Balf.f. – Socotra
  - Trichocalyx orbiculatus Balf.f. – Socotra

== Amaranthaceae ==
- Paraerva T.Hammer
  - Paraerva microphylla (Moq.) T.Hammer – Socotra and Abd al Kuri
  - Paraerva revoluta (Balf.f.) T.Hammer – Socotra

== Amaranthaceae ==
- Psilotrichum aphyllum C.C.Towns. northeastern and southern Socotra

== Amaryllidaceae ==
- Crinum balfourii Mast. – Socotra

== Anacardiaceae ==
- Lannea transulta (Balf.f.) Radcl.-Sm. – Socotra
- Searsia thyrsiflora (Balf.f.) Moffett – Socotra

== Apiaceae ==
- Nirarathamnos Balf.f.
  - Nirarathamnos asarifolius Balf.f. – Socotra (Hajhir Mts.)
- Peucedanum cordatum Balf.f. – Socotra

== Apocynaceae ==
- Cryptolepis arbuscula (Radcl.-Sm.) Venter – north-central and northeastern Socotra
- Cryptolepis intricata (Balf.f.) Venter – Socotra
- Cryptolepis macrophylla (Radcl.-Sm.) Venter – Socotra
- Cryptolepis socotrana (Balf.f.) Venter – Socotra
- Cryptolepis volubilis (Balf.f.) O.Schwartz – Socotra
- Cynanchum socotranum (Lavranos) Meve & Liede – central and eastern Socotra
- Duvaliandra M.G.Gilbert
  - Duvaliandra dioscoridis (Lavranos) M.G.Gilbert – Socotra (Hajhir Mts.)
- Echidnopsis bentii N.E.Br. ex Hook.f. – Socotra (Hajhir Mts.)
- Echidnopsis inconspicua Bruyns – west-central Socotra
- Echidnopsis insularis Lavranos – Socotra
- Echidnopsis milleri Lavranos – northwestern Socotra
- Echidnopsis socotrana Lavranos – western and central Socotra
- Secamone cuneifolia Bruyns – Socotra
- Secamone socotrana Balf.f. – Socotra
- Socotrella Bruyns & A.G.Mill. – Socotra
  - Socotrella dolichocnema Bruyns – western Socotra
- Vincetoxicum linifolium Balf.f. – Socotra

== Asparagaceae ==
- Chlorophytum graptophyllum (Baker) Marais & Reilly – Socotra
- Dipcadi balfourii Baker – Socotra
- Dipcadi guichardii Radcl.-Sm. – Socotra
- Dipcadi kuriensis A.G.Mill. – Socotra
- Dracaena cinnabari Balf.f. – Socotra
- Ledebouria grandifolia (Balf.f.) A.G.Mill. & D.Alexander – Socotra
- Ledebouria insularis A.G.Mill. – Socotra

== Asphodelaceae ==
- Aloe × buzairiensis Lodé (A. perryi × A. squarrosa) – Socotra
- Aloe forbesii Balf.f. – Socotra (central Hajhir Mts.)
- Aloe haggeherensis T.A.McCoy & Lavranos – Socotra (Hajhir Mts.)
- Aloe jawiyon S.J.Christie, D.P.Hannon & Oakman ex A.G.Mill. – Socotra
- Aloe perryi Baker – Socotra
- Aloe squarrosa Baker ex Balf.f. – western Socotra

== Aspleniaceae ==
- Asplenium schweinfurthii Baker – Socotra and Abd al Kuri

== Asteraceae ==
- Distephanus qazmi N.Kilian & A.G.Mill. – Socotra
- Erythroseris amabilis (Balf.f.) N.Kilian & Gemeinholzer – Socotra
- Helichrysum paulayanum Vierh. – Socotra
- Kleinia scottii (Balf.f.) P.Halliday – Socotra
- Launaea crepoides Balf.f. – Socotra and Samhah
- Launaea rhynchocarpa (Balf.f.) B.Mies – Socotra and Abd al Kuri
- Launaea socotrana N.Kilian – Socotra and Samhah
- Libinhania acicularis (Balf.f.) N.Kilian, Galbany, Oberpr. & A.G.Mill. – Socotra
- Libinhania arachnoides (Balf.f.) N.Kilian, Galbany, Oberpr. & A.G.Mill. – Socotra and Samhah
- Libinhania balfourii (Vierh.) N.Kilian, Galbany, Oberpr. & A.G.Mill. – Socotra
- Libinhania discolor A.G.Mill., Sommerer & N.Kilian – Socotra
- Libinhania fontinalis A.G.Mill., Sommerer & N.Kilian – Socotra
- Libinhania hegerensis A.G.Mill. & N.Kilian – Socotra
- Libinhania nimmoana (Oliv. & Hiern) N.Kilian, Galbany, Oberpr. & A.G.Mill. – Socotra
- Libinhania nivea A.G.Mill., Sommerer & N.Kilian – Socotra
- Libinhania pendula A.G.Mill., Sommerer & N.Kilian – Socotra
- Libinhania rosulata (Oliv. & Hiern) N.Kilian – Socotra
- Libinhania sphaerocephala (Balf.f.) N.Kilian, Galbany, Oberpr. & A.G.Mill. – Socotra
- Libinhania suffruticosa (Balf.f.) N.Kilian, Galbany, Oberpr. & A.G.Mill. – Socotra
- Macledium canum (Balf.f.) S.Ortiz – Socotra
- †Pluchea glutinosa Balf.f. – Socotra; last recorded in 1881 and presumed extinct
- Pluchea obovata Balf.f. – Socotra
- †Psiadia schweinfurthii Balf.f. – Socotra (northern Hajhir Mts.); last recorded in 1881 and presumed extinct
- Pulicaria aromatica (Balf.f.) S.King-Jones & N.Kilian – Socotra
- Pulicaria dioscorides R.Atk. – Socotra
- Pulicaria diversifolia Balf.f. – Socotra and Samhah
- Pulicaria elegans E.Gamal-Eldin – Socotra
- Pulicaria lanata E.Gamal-Eldin – Socotra
- Pulicaria stephanocarpa Balf.f. – Socotra, Samhah, and Abd al Kuri
- Pulicaria vieraeoides Balf.f. – Socotra
- Vernonia cockburniana Balf.f. – Socotra
- Vernonia unicata C.Jeffrey – Socotra
- Volutaria socotrensis Wagenitz – Socotra

== Begoniaceae ==
- Begonia samhaensis M.Hughes & A.G.Mill. – Samhah
- Begonia socotrana Hook.f.) – Hajhir Mts. and adjacent high limestone plateaux of north-central Socotra

== Boraginaceae ==
- Cystostemon socotranus Balf.f. – Socotra
- Echiochilon pulvinatum A.G.Mill. & L.Urb. – western and southwestern Socotra
- Euploca nigricans (Balf.f.) M.W.Frohl., M.W.Chase & Thulin – south-central and southwestern Socotra
- Heliotropium balfourii Gürke – Socotra
- Heliotropium dentatum Balf.f. – northern Socotra
- Heliotropium derafontense Vierh. – north-northeastern Socotra
- Heliotropium kuriense Vierh. – Abd al Kuri
- Heliotropium paulayanum Vierh. – Abd al Kuri
- Heliotropium riebeckii Schweinf. & Vierh. – Socotra
- Heliotropium shoabense Vierh. – eastern Socotra
- Heliotropium sokotranum Vierh. – Socotra
- Heliotropium wagneri Vierh. – Abd al Kuri and Samhah
- Trichodesma laxiflorum Balf.f. – Socotra
- Trichodesma microcalyx Balf.f. – Socotra (Hajhir Mts.)
- Trichodesma scottii Balf.f. – Socotra

== Brassicaceae ==
- Erucastrum rostratum (Balf.f.) Gómez-Campo – Socotra
- Farsetia inconspicua A.G.Mill. – western Socotra
- Farsetia socotrana B.L.Burtt – Socotra
- Hemicrambe fruticosa (C.C.Towns.) Gómez-Campo – Socotra (Hajhir Mts.)
- Hemicrambe socotrana (A.G.Mill.) Al-Shehbaz – western Socotra
- Lachnocapsa Balf.f. – Socotra
  - Lachnocapsa spathulata Balf.f. – Socotra

== Burseraceae ==
- Boswellia ameero Balf.f. – Socotra
- Boswellia asplenifolia (Balf.f.) Thulin – northwestern and north-central Socotra
- Boswellia bullata Thulin – northwestern Socotra
- Boswellia dioscoridis Thulin – Socotra
- Boswellia elongata Balf.f. – Socotra
- Boswellia nana Hepper – northeastern Socotra
- Boswellia popoviana Hepper – Socotra
- Boswellia samhaensis Thulin & Scholte – Socotra
- Boswellia scopulorum Thulin – Socotra
- Boswellia socotrana Balf.f. – north-central and northeastern Socotra
- Commiphora ornifolia (Balf.f.) J.B.Gillett – Socotra
  - Commiphora ornifolia var. glabra (Radcl.-Sm.) J.B.Gillett – Socotra
  - Commiphora ornifolia var. ornifolia – Socotra
- Commiphora parvifolia (Balf.f.) Engl. – Socotra
- Commiphora planifrons (Balf.f.) Engl. – Socotra
- Commiphora socotrana (Balf.f.) Engl. – Socotra

== Campanulaceae ==
- Campanula balfourii J.Wagner & Vierh. – Socotra

== Capparaceae ==
- Cadaba insularis A.G.Mill. – Socotra
- Maerua angolensis subsp. socotrana (Schweinf. ex Balf.f.) Kers – Socotra

== Caprifoliaceae ==
- †Valeriana extincta Christenh. & Byng – northwestern Socotra (Jebel Ma’alih), Last recorded in 1880.

== Caryophyllaceae ==
- Gymnocarpos bracteatus (Balf.f.) Petruss. & Thulin – Socotra (Hajhir Mts.)
- Gymnocarpos kuriensis (Radcl.-Sm.) Petruss. & Thulin – Socotra and Abd al Kuri
- Haya Balf.f. – Socotra
  - Haya obovata Balf.f. – Socotra
- Polycarpaea balfourii Briq. – Socotra
- Polycarpaea caespitosa Balf.f. – Socotra
- Polycarpaea hassalensis D.F.Chamb. – Abd al Kuri
- Polycarpaea hayoides D.F.Chamb. – Socotra
- Polycarpaea kuriensis R.Wagner – Socotra
- Polycarpaea paulayana R.Wagner – northern Socotra and Samhah

== Cleomaceae ==
- Cleome socotrana Balf.f. – Socotra

== Colchicaceae ==
- Iphigenia socotrana Thulin – Socotra

== Convolvulaceae ==
- Convolvulus grantii Balf.f – Abd al Kuri
- Convolvulus kossmatii Vierh. – Abd al Kuri
- Convolvulus semhaensis (R.R.Mill) J.A.Luna & Carine – Samhah
- Convolvulus socotranus Verdc. – Socotra
- Cuscuta balansae var. socotrensis Yunck. – Socotra
- Cuscuta planiflora var. globularis Balf.f. – Socotra
- Metaporana obtusa (Balf.f.) Staples – Socotra
- Seddera pedunculata (Balf.f.) Hallier f. – Socotra

== Crassulaceae ==
- Kalanchoe farinacea Balf.f. – Socotra
- Kalanchoe robusta Balf.f. – Socotra

== Cucurbitaceae ==
- Eureiandra balfourii Cogn. & Balf.f. – Socotra

== Cyperaceae ==
- Carex socotrana Repka & P.Madera – Socotra

== Dioscoreaceae ==
- Dioscorea lanata Balf.f. – Socotra (Hajhir Mts.)

== Dirachmaceae ==
- Dirachma socotrana Schweinf. ex Balf.f. – northern and northeastern Socotra

== Erythroxylaceae ==
- Erythroxylum socotranum Thulin – southwestern Socotra

== Euphorbiaceae ==
- Cephalocrotonopsis Pax – Socotra
  - Cephalocrotonopsis socotranus (Balf.f.) Pax – Socotra
- Croton sarcocarpus Balf.f. – Socotra
- Croton socotranus Balf.f. – Socotra
  - Croton socotranus var. pachyclados (Radcl.-Sm.) Radcl.-Sm. – Socotra (Mt. Hamaderoh)
  - Croton socotranus var. socotranus – Socotra
- Croton sulcifructus Balf.f. – Socotra (Hajhir Mts.)
- Euphorbia abdelkuri Balf.f. – Abd al Kuri
- Euphorbia arbuscula Balf.f. – Socotra
- Euphorbia hajhirensis Radcl.-Sm. – Socotra (central Hajhir Mts.)
- Euphorbia hamaderoensis A.G.Mill. – Socotra
- Euphorbia kischenensis Vierh. – Socotra
- Euphorbia kuriensis Vierh. – Abd al Kuri
- Euphorbia leptoclada Balf.f. – Socotra
- Euphorbia marie-cladieae Rzepecky – Socotra
- Euphorbia mtolohensis Lodé – Socotra (Jabal Mtoloh)
- Euphorbia obcordata Balf.f. – Socotra
- Euphorbia schweinfurthii Balf.f. – Socotra
- Euphorbia socotrana Balf.f. – Socotra
- Euphorbia socotrana subsp. purpurea N.Kilian & P.Hein – Socotra
- Euphorbia socotrana subsp. socotrana – Socotra
- Euphorbia spiralis Balf.f. – Socotra
- Jatropha unicostata Balf.f. – Socotra
- Tragia balfourii Prain – Socotra

== Fabaceae ==
- Chapmannia gracilis (Balf.f.) Thulin – north-central and northeastern Socotra
- Chapmannia reghidensis Thulin & McKean – northern Socotra
- Chapmannia sericea Thulin & McKean – western and southwestern Socotra
- Chapmannia tinireana Thulin – north-central Socotra
- Crotalaria socotrana (Balf.f.) Thulin – north-central Socotra
- Crotalaria strigulosa Balf.f. – Socotra and Abd al Kuri
- Dichrostachys dehiscens Balf.f. – north-central and central Socotra
- Indigofera marmorata Balf.f. – north-central Socotra
- Indigofera nephrocarpoides J.B.Gillett – Socotra and Samhah
- Indigofera sokotrana Vierh. – Socotra (Hajhir Mts.)
- Lotus mollis Balf.f. – Socotra and Samhah
- Lotus ononopsis Balf.f. – north-central and northeastern Socotra
- Paracalyx balfourii (Vierh.) Ali – Socotra and Samhah
- Taverniera sericophylla Balf.f. – western and northern Socotra
- Tephrosia odorata Balf.f. – Socotra
- Tephrosia socotrana Thulin – northern Socotra
- Trigonella falcata Balf.f. – western Socotra
- Vachellia pennivenia (Balf.f.) F.L.Anderson & Knees – Socotra
- Zygocarpum caeruleum (Balf.f.) Thulin & Lavin – Socotra

== Gentianaceae ==
- Exacum caeruleum Balf.f. – Socotra (Hajhir Mts.)
- Exacum socotranum Vierh. – southwestern Socotra

== Geraniaceae ==
- Pelargonium insularis Gibby & A.G.Mill. – Samhah

== Goodeniaceae ==
- Scaevola socotraensis H.St.John – southwestern Socotra

== Hypericaceae ==
- Hypericum balfourii N.Robson – north-northeastern Socotra
- Hypericum fieriense N.Robson – Socotra (Hajhir Mts.)
- Hypericum scopulorum Balf.f. – Socotra (Hajhir Mts.)
- Hypericum smithii (N.Robson) N.Robson – central and eastern Socotra
- Hypericum socotranum R.D.Good – northwestern Socotra
- Hypericum tortuosum Balf.f. – Socotra

== Iridaceae ==
- Cyanixia Goldblatt & J.C.Manning – Socotra
  - Cyanixia socotrana (Hook.f.) Goldblatt & J.C.Manning – Socotra

== Lamiaceae ==
- Clerodendrum galeatum Balf.f. – Socotra (Hajhir Mts.)
- Clerodendrum leucophloeum Balf.f. – Socotra
- Coleus socotranus (Radcl.-Sm.) A.J.Paton – Socotra
- Lavandula nimmoi Benth. in A.P.de Candolle – Socotra
- Leucas flagellifera (Balf.f.) Gürke – western Socotra and Samhah
- Leucas hagghierensis Al-Gifri & Cortés-Burns – Socotra (Hajhir Mts.)
- Leucas kishenensis (Radcl.-Sm.) Sebald – Socotra
- Leucas penduliflora Al-Gifri & Cortés-Burns – north-central Socotra
- Leucas samhaensis Cortés-Burns & A.G.Mill. – Samhah
- Leucas spiculifolia (Balf.f.) Gürke – Socotra
- Leucas virgata Balf.f. – Socotra
- Orthosiphon ferrugineus Balf.f. – north-central Socotra
- Teucrium balfourii Vierh. – Socotra and Samhah
- Teucrium socotranum Vierh. – northern and eastern Socotra

== Lythraceae ==
- Punica protopunica Balf.f. – Socotra

== Malpighiaceae ==
- Acridocarpus socotranus Oliv. – Socotra

== Malvaceae ==
- Corchorus erodioides Balf.f. – Socotra and Samhah
- Grewia bilocularis Balf.f. – Socotra
- Grewia turbinata Balf.f. – Socotra (Hajhir Mts.)
- Hibiscus dioscorides A.G.Mill. – Socotra (eastern Hajhir Mts.)
- Hibiscus diriffan A.G.Mill. – central and south-central Socotra
- Hibiscus macropodus Wagner & Vierh. – north-central Socotra
- Hibiscus malacophyllus Balf.f. – north-central Socotra
- Hibiscus noli-tangere A.G.Mill. – northeastern Socotra
- Hibiscus quattenensis A.G.Mill. & Thulin – western and southwestern Socotra
- Hibiscus scottii Balf.f. – north-central Socotra
- Hibiscus socotranus G.Ll.Lucas – northwestern Socotra
- Hibiscus stenanthus Balf.f. – eastern Socotra

== Meliaceae ==
- Turraea socotrana Styles & F.White – Socotra

== Moraceae ==
- Dorstenia gigas Schweinf. ex Balf.f. – Socotra
- Dorstenia socotrana A.G.Mill. – northeastern Socotra

== Nyctaginaceae ==
- Commicarpus heimerlii (Vierh.) Meikle – Socotra
- Commicarpus simonyi (Heimerl & Vierh.) Meikle – Socotra

== Oleaceae ==
- Jasminum fluminense subsp. socotranum P.S.Green – Socotra

== Orchidaceae ==
- Holothrix socotrana Rolfe – Socotra

== Orobanchaceae ==
- Graderia fruticosa Balf.f. – Socotra (Hajhir Mts.)
- Lindenbergia sokotrana Vierh. – Socotra
- Xylocalyx aculeolatus S.Carter – Socotra
- Xylocalyx asper Balf.f. – Socotra and Samhah

== Phyllanthaceae ==
- Andrachne schweinfurthii var. papillosa Radcl.-Sm. – Socotra (Khlohat)
- Meineckia filipes (Balf.f.) G.L.Webster – Socotra
- Nanorrhinum kuriense (Radcl.-Sm.) Ghebr. – Abd al Kuri and Samhah

== Plumbaginaceae ==
- Limonium guigliae Raimondo & Domina – Socotra
- Limonium paulayanum (Vierh.) Ghaz. & J.R.Edm. – Socotra
- Limonium sokotranum (Vierh.) Radcl.-Sm. – Socotra
- Plumbago pendula (Balf.f.) Christenh. & Byng – north-central Socotra
- Plumbago socotrana (Balf.f.) ined. – Socotra

== Poaceae ==
- Andropogon bentii Stapf – Socotra
- Aristida anaclasta Cope – Socotra
- Dactyloctenium hackelii J.Wagner & Vierh. – Socotra and Abd al Kuri
- Lepturus calcareus Cope – Socotra
- Lepturus nesiotes Cope – Socotra
- Lepturus pulchellus (Balf.f.) Clayton – Socotra and Samhah
- Lepturus tenuis Balf.f. – Socotra
- Panicum rigidum Balf.f. – Socotra, Samhah, and Abd al Kuri
- Panicum socotranum Cope – Socotra
- Tricholaena vestita (Balf.f.) Stapf & C.E.Hubb. – Socotra

== Polygalaceae ==
- Polygala kuriensis A.G.Mill. – Abd al Kuri

== Portulacaceae ==
- Portulaca kuriensis M.G.Gilbert – Abd al Kuri
- Portulaca monanthoides Lodé – western Socotra
- Portulaca samhaensis A.G.Mill. – Samhah

== Resedaceae ==
- Ochradenus socotranus A.G.Mill. – Socotra and Samhah
- Reseda viridis Balf.f. – Socotra and Abd al Kuri

== Rubiaceae ==
- Dirichletia obovata Balf.f. – Socotra
- Dirichletia virgata (Balf.f.) Kårehed & B.Bremer – Socotra
- Kohautia socotrana Bremek. – Socotra
- Kraussia socotrana Bridson – Socotra
- Oldenlandia aretioides Vierh. – northwestern and southeastern Socotra
- Oldenlandia balfourii Bremek. – Socotra
- Oldenlandia bicornuta (Balf.f.) Bremek. – Socotra
- Oldenlandia ocellata Bremek. – Abd-al-Kuri
- Oldenlandia pulvinata (Balf.f.) Vierh. – Socotra and Samhah
- Plocama puberula (Balf.f.) M.Backlund & Thulin – Socotra
- Plocama putorioides (Radcl.-Sm.) M.Backlund & Thulin – Socotra (central Hajhir Mts.)
- Plocama thymoides (Balf.f.) M.Backlund & Thulin – northwestern Socotra
- Pyrostria socotrana (Radcl.-Sm.) Bridson – Socotra (Hajhir Mts.)
- Tamridaea Thulin & B.Bremer – Socotra
  - Tamridaea capsulifera (Balf.f.) Thulin & B.Bremer – Socotra

== Rutaceae ==
- Thamnosma socotrana Balf.f. – Socotra (Hajhir Mts.)

== Sapotaceae ==
- Sideroxylon fimbriatum Balf.f. – Socotra (Hajhir Mts.)
- Spiniluma discolor (Radcl.-Sm.) Friis – Socotra (Hajhir Mts.)

== Solanaceae ==
- Lycium sokotranum R.Wagner & Vierh. – Socotra and Abd al Kuri
- Withania adunensis Vierh. – Socotra
- Withania riebeckii Schweinf. ex Balf.f. – Socotra and Samhah

== Thymelaeaceae ==
- Lasiosiphon socotranus Balf.f. – Socotra

== Verbenaceae ==
- Coelocarpum haggierense A.G.Mill. – north-central and northeastern Socotra
- Coelocarpum socotranum Balf.f. – Socotra
- Priva socotrana Moldenke – Socotra and Samhah

== Vitaceae ==
- Cissus hamaderohensis Radcl.-Sm. – Socotra
- Cissus paniculata (Balf.f.) Planch. – Socotra (Hajhir Mts.)
- Cissus salehi Lodé – Socotra
- Cissus subaphylla (Balf.f.) Planch. – Socotra and Samhah
