= Socotra Island xeric shrublands =

Terrestrial ecoregion that covers the Socotra Archipelago

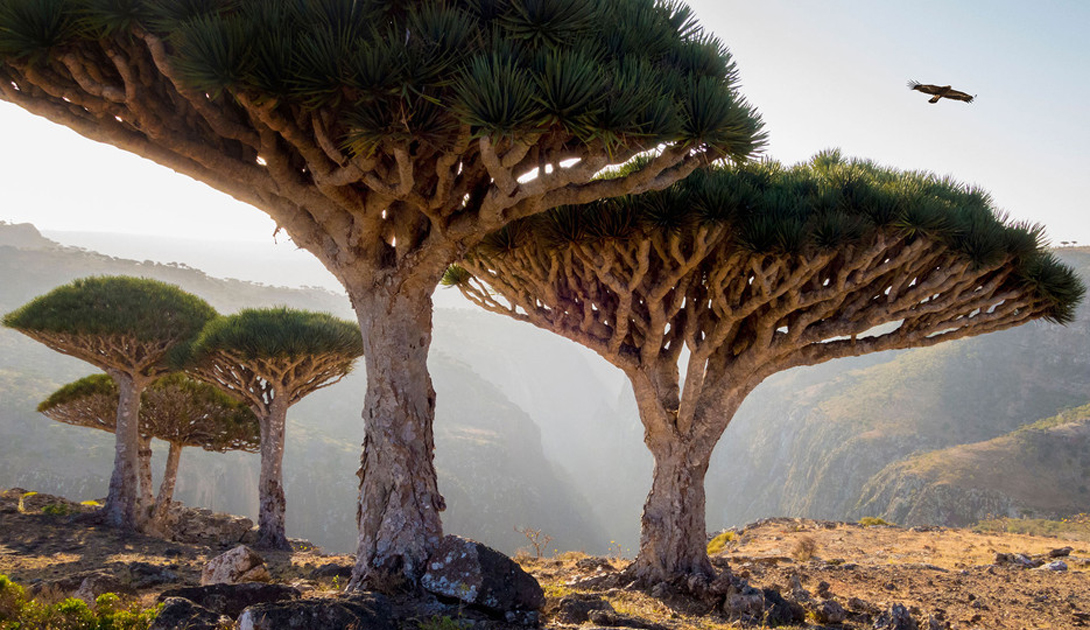
- Socotra dragon tree (Dracaena cinnabari)

- Topographic map of the Socotra Archipelago

Ecology
- Realm: Afrotropical
- Biome: deserts and xeric shrublands

Geography
- Area: 3,616 km^{2} (1,396 mi^{2})
- Country: Yemen

Conservation
- Conservation status: Critical/endangered
- Protected: 0 km^{2} (0%)

The Socotra Island xeric shrublands is a terrestrial ecoregion that covers the large island of Socotra and several smaller islands that constitute the Socotra Archipelago. The archipelago is in the western Indian Ocean, east of the Horn of Africa and south of the Arabian Peninsula. Politically the archipelago is part of Yemen, and lies south of the Yemeni mainland.

Socotra has a uniquely diverse ecosystem. The islands are home to a high number of endemic species; up to a third of its plant life is endemic. It has been described as "the most alien-looking place on Earth."

Socotra is considered the jewel of biodiversity in the Arabian Sea. In the 1990s, a team of United Nations biologists conducted a survey of the archipelago's flora and fauna. They counted nearly 700 endemic species, found nowhere else on earth; only New Zealand, Hawaii, New Caledonia, and the Galápagos Islands have more impressive numbers. In 2008 Socotra was recognised as a UNESCO World Heritage Site.

The ecoregion is at increasing risk from human activities. The WWF describes the Socotra Archipelago's conservation status as "Critical/Endangered".

== Geography ==
Socotra is the easternmost island in the Socotra Archipelago, and constitutes around 95% of the archipelago's landmass. The island has an area of approximately 3,600 km^{2}, and measures 132 kilometres (82 mi) in length and 49.7 kilometres (30.9 mi) in width. Socotra lies some 240 kilometres (150 mi) east of the coast of Somalia and 380 kilometres (240 mi) south of the Arabian Peninsula.

A coastal plain, up to 5 km wide, extends around most of Socotra. The coastal plain's soils are mostly alluvial deposits of stone and coarse sand. The Noged Plain along the island's south shore has areas of sand dunes. The center of the island is a plateau, 300 to 700 meters in elevation, composed mostly of Cretaceous limestone. The Hajhir Mountains in northwestern Socotra are composed of precambrian granites and metamorphic rock, and include Mashanig, the island's highest point (1,519 m).

The other islands in the archipelago are Samhah and Darsah, known as The Brothers, and Abd al Kuri. Abd al Kuri is the westernmost island and lies closest to the African mainland, only 90 km away. Abd al Kuri has an area of 133 km^{2} and is dominated by a limestone plateau reaching up to 740 metres elevation. Samhah is 50 km southwest of Socotra with an area of 41 km^{2} and also comprises a limestone plateau reaching 680 metres elevation. Darsah lies east of Samhah and is the smallest at 17 km^{2} and 350 metres elevation. Abd al Kuri and Samhah are inhabited, but largely deserted during the winter monsoon season.

Politically, Socotra and most of the other islands are part of Yemen, and constitute Socotra Governorate. Geographically, Socotra and the rest of its archipelago are part of Africa – a geologic and biogeographic extension of the Horn of Africa.

The archipelago is an ancient continental fragment. The opening of the East African Rift created the Gulf of Aden and separated the islands from the Arabian Peninsula starting 18 million years ago. Lower sea levels during the ice ages connected Socotra to Samhah and Darsah, but deeper sea trenches kept Abd al Kuri separated from the African mainland and the other islands.

== Climate ==
The climate of the ecoregion is tropical and mostly arid. It is influenced by the Indian Ocean's monsoon winds. The April-to-October southwest monsoon brings hot dry winds from the Horn of Africa. The Northeast monsoon arrives during the winter months, from November to March, and brings lower temperatures and more moisture.

Average annual rainfall ranges from 150 mm on the coastal plain to more than 1,000 mm in the mountains. Rainfall is sporadic and unpredictable. Tropical cyclones are rare. Nighttime dew is an important water source for the islands' plants.

The mountains intercept moisture-bearing winds, which creates more clouds, fog, and orographic precipitation. The mountains are also cooler than the lowlands. Small mountain streams sustain aquatic habitats, and can flow down through the lowlands during the cooler and wetter winter months and during high rainfall events. Sea-facing slopes and cliffs also receive more moisture from sea fogs and orographic precipitation than other lowland areas.

Abd al Kuri, Samhah, and Darsah have desertic climates and no year-round surface streams.

== Flora ==
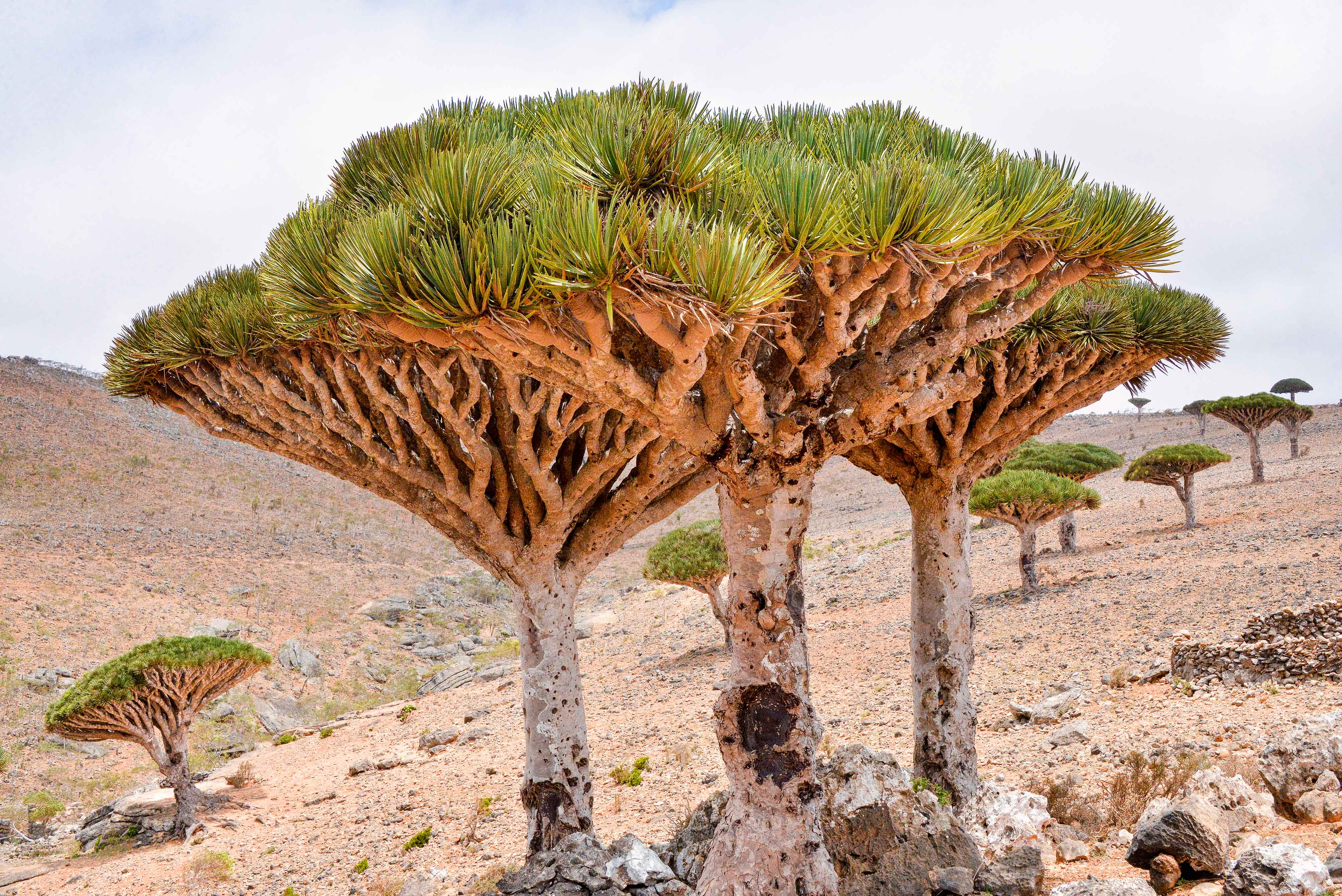
Dragon's Blood Trees

The long geological isolation of the Socotra archipelago and its fierce heat and drought have combined to create a unique and spectacular endemic flora. Botanical field surveys led by the Centre for Middle Eastern Plants, part of the Royal Botanic Garden Edinburgh, indicate that 307 out of the 825 (37%) plant species on Socotra are endemic, i.e., they are found nowhere else on Earth. Genera endemic to the Socotra archipelago include Angkalanthus, Ballochia, Cephalocrotonopsis, Cyanixia, Duvaliandra, Haya, Lachnocapsa, Paraerva, Socotrella, and Tamridaea. The entire flora of the Socotra Archipelago has been assessed for the IUCN Red List, with 3 Critically Endangered and 27 Endangered plant species recognised in 2004.

Open deciduous shrublands are the primary vegetation in the coastal plain and low limestone foothills. Many plants lose their leaves during the dry summer months, and succulent plants that store water in leaves and stems are common. The predominant shrubs are the endemics Croton socotranus and Jatropha unicostata. The succulent trees Euphorbia arbuscula, Dendrosicyos socotranus, and Adenium obesum spp. sokotranum rise above the shrub layer. Woody trees include Sterculia africana var. socotrana, Ziziphus spina-christi, and species of Boswellia and Commiphora. Grasses and herbs grow during periods of sufficient rainfall.

Thickets of semi-deciduous shrubs and low trees occur on the limestone plateau and lower slopes of Hajhir Mountains. The predominant shrubs Searsia thyrsiflora, Buxus hildebrandtii, Dirichletia obovata (syn. Carphalea obovata), and Croton spp.

Dense shrub thickets of Searsia thyrsiflora, Cephalocrotonopsis socotranus, and Allophylus rhoidiphyllus grow on the high mountain slopes. Dragon's blood tree (Dracaena cinnabari), a strange-looking, umbrella-shaped tree, rises above the shrub layer. Other high-mountain plant communities include low shrublands dominated by Hypericum, anthropogenic pastures, and rock outcrops with lichens and low cushion plants, including the endemics Nirarathamnos asarifolius and species of Helichrysum.

Dragon's blood tree is one of the most striking of Socotra's plants. Its red sap was thought to be the dragon's blood of the ancients, sought after as a dye, and today used as paint and varnish. Socotra's various endemic aloes were also important historically for medicine and cosmetics. Other endemic plants include the giant succulent tree Dorstenia gigas, the cucumber tree Dendrosicyos socotranus, the rare Socotran pomegranate (Punica protopunica), Aloe perryi, and Boswellia socotrana.

== Fauna ==
The islands' fauna includes several endemic species.

The islands have 178 known bird species, including six endemic species – the Socotra starling (Onychognathus frater), Socotra sunbird (Nectarinia balfouri), Socotra bunting (Emberiza socotrana), Socotra cisticola (Cisticola haesitatus), Socotra sparrow (Passer insularis), Socotra golden-winged grosbeak (Rhynchostruthus socotranus), and Socotra warbler (Incana incana). Many of the bird species are endangered by predation by non-native feral cats.

About 15 species of mammals live on Socotra. There are four species of bats, the Egyptian mouse-tailed bat (Rhinopoma cystops), Geoffroy's horseshoe bat (Rhinolophus clivosus), Somalian trident bat (Asellia italosomalica), and the endemic Socotran pipistrelle (Hypsugo lanzai). The Egyptian mouse-tailed bat has been recorded on all the islands, and the other three species only on Socotra. The other mammals were introduced by humans. The Socotran wild ass is a feral population of African wild ass (Equus africanus) that lives in the lowlands of Socotra. Introduced livestock include dromedary camels, cattle, and goats, which include both domestic and feral populations. Other introduced mammals include the domestic cat (Felis catus), lesser Indian civet (Viverricula indica), black rat (Rattus rattus), house mouse (Mus musculus), Etruscan shrew (Suncus etruscus), and Madagascan pygmy shrew (Suncus madagascariensis).

Reptiles constitute a diverse Socotran vertebrate fauna with 31 species. If one excludes the two recently introduced species, Hemidactylus robustus and Hemidactylus flaviviridis, all native species are endemic. There is a very high level of endemism at both species (29 of 31, 94%) and genus levels (5 of 12, 42%). At the species level, endemicity may be even higher, as phylogenetic studies have uncovered substantial hidden diversity. The reptile species include skinks, legless lizards, and one species of chameleon, Chamaeleo monachus.

There are many endemic invertebrates, including several spiders (such as the tarantula Monocentropus balfouri) and three species of freshwater crabs (one Socotra pseudocardisoma and two Socotrapotamon). Socotra is also one of the homes of the butterfly Bicyclus anynana. 73% of isopod crustacean species are endemic. 95% of the approximately 100 species of land snails are endemic, with 75% of genera endemic to the archipelago and major radiations in three families, the operculate family Pomatiidae and the pulmonate families Cerastidae and Subulinidae.

The coral reefs of Socotra are diverse, with many endemic species.

== Human impacts ==
Over the two thousand years of human settlement on the islands the environment has slowly but continuously changed, and, according to Jonathan Kingdon, "the animals and plants that remain represent a degraded fraction of what once existed." The Periplus of the Erythraean Sea says the island had crocodiles and large lizards, and the present reptilian fauna appears to be greatly reduced. Until a few centuries ago, there were rivers and wetlands on the island, greater stocks of the endemic trees, and abundant pasture. The Portuguese recorded the presence of water buffaloes in the early 17th century. Now there are only sand gullies, and many native plants only survive where there is greater moisture or protection from livestock. The remaining Socotra fauna is greatly threatened by goats and other introduced species.

== Conservation and threats ==
The United Nations Environment Programme named unplanned urbanisation and tourism development, overgrazing, resource exploitation, invasive species, and climate change as threats to Socotra's biodiversity. Socotra has become economically isolated from mainland Yemen since 2014 by the Yemen civil war. As a result the price of cooking gas and other fuels has increased, causing residents to turn to wood for heat and cooking.

=== World Heritage Site ===
The island was recognised by the United Nations Educational, Scientific and Cultural Organization (UNESCO) as a world natural heritage site in July 2008. The European Union has supported such a move, calling on both UNESCO and International Organisation of Protecting Environment to classify the island archipelago among the environmental heritages.

== See also ==
- List of ecoregions in Yemen
