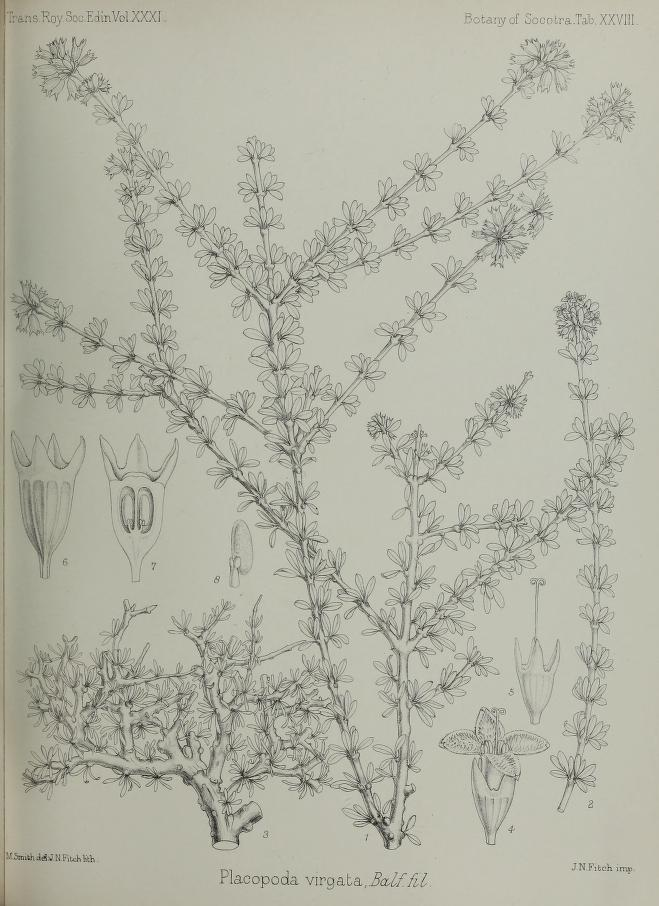

Conservation status
- Least Concern (IUCN 3.1)

Scientific classification
- Kingdom: Plantae
- Clade: Tracheophytes
- Clade: Angiosperms
- Clade: Eudicots
- Clade: Asterids
- Order: Gentianales
- Family: Rubiaceae
- Genus: Dirichletia
- Species: D. virgata

Binomial name
- Dirichletia virgata (Balf.f.) Kårehed & B.Bremer (2007)

Synonyms
- Placopoda virgata Balf.f. (1882); Placopoda virgata var. nana Balf.f. (1884)

= Dirichletia virgata =

Species of plant

Dirichletia virgata, synonym Placopoda virgata, is a species of plant in the family Rubiaceae. It is a shrub endemic to the islands of Socotra and Samhah in Yemen's Socotra Archipelago. It is widespread plant in low-elevation shrublands and woodlands, including Croton socotranus shrubland and drought-deciduous woodland, on coastal plains, dry foothills, and limestone plateaus from 10 to 600 metres elevation.
