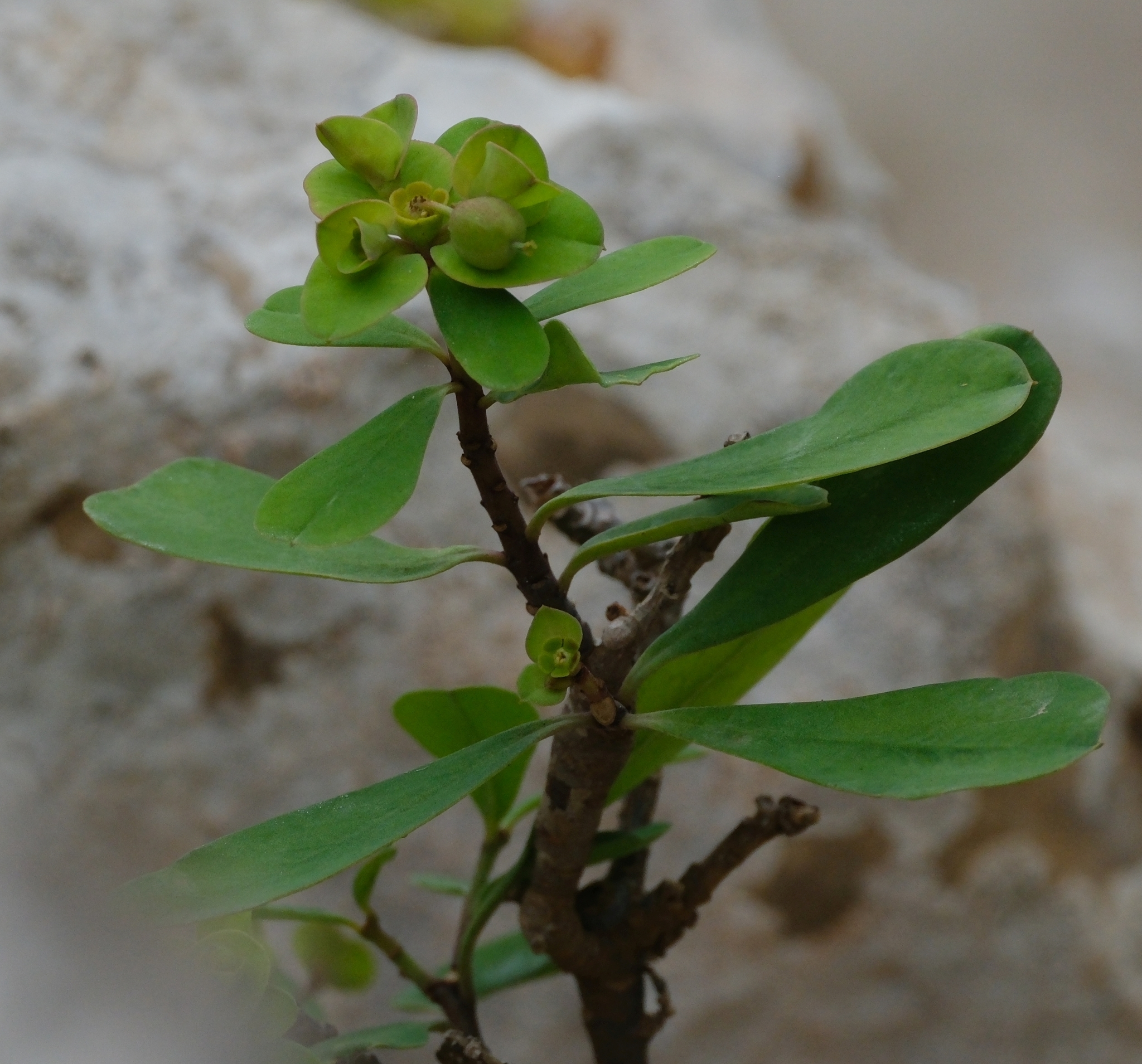

Conservation status
- Vulnerable (IUCN 3.1)

Scientific classification
- Kingdom: Plantae
- Clade: Tracheophytes
- Clade: Angiosperms
- Clade: Eudicots
- Clade: Rosids
- Order: Malpighiales
- Family: Euphorbiaceae
- Genus: Euphorbia
- Species: E. obcordata

Binomial name
- Euphorbia obcordata Balf.f.

= Euphorbia obcordata =

Species of plant

Euphorbia obcordata is a species of flowering plant in the family Euphorbiaceae. It is a tree endemic to the island of Socotra in Yemen. It grows in semi-deciduous dry woodland on limestone cliffs, often growing from vertical rock faces, from 450 to 650 metres elevation.

The species was described by Isaac Bayley Balfour in 1883.
