= Leucas virgata =

Conservation status
- Least Concern (IUCN 3.1)

Scientific classification
- Kingdom: Plantae
- Clade: Tracheophytes
- Clade: Angiosperms
- Clade: Eudicots
- Clade: Asterids
- Order: Lamiales
- Family: Lamiaceae
- Genus: Leucas
- Species: L. virgata

Binomial name
- Leucas virgata Balf.f.

Species of plant

Leucas virgata is a species of flowering plant in the family Lamiaceae. It is endemic to the island of Socotra in Yemen. It is common and widespread in open shrubland and drought-deciduous woodland on the island's limestone plateaus from 100 to 700 metres elevation.

In 2004, Leucas virgata was assessed under IUCN Red List of Threatened Species and was categorized as 'Least Concern'.
