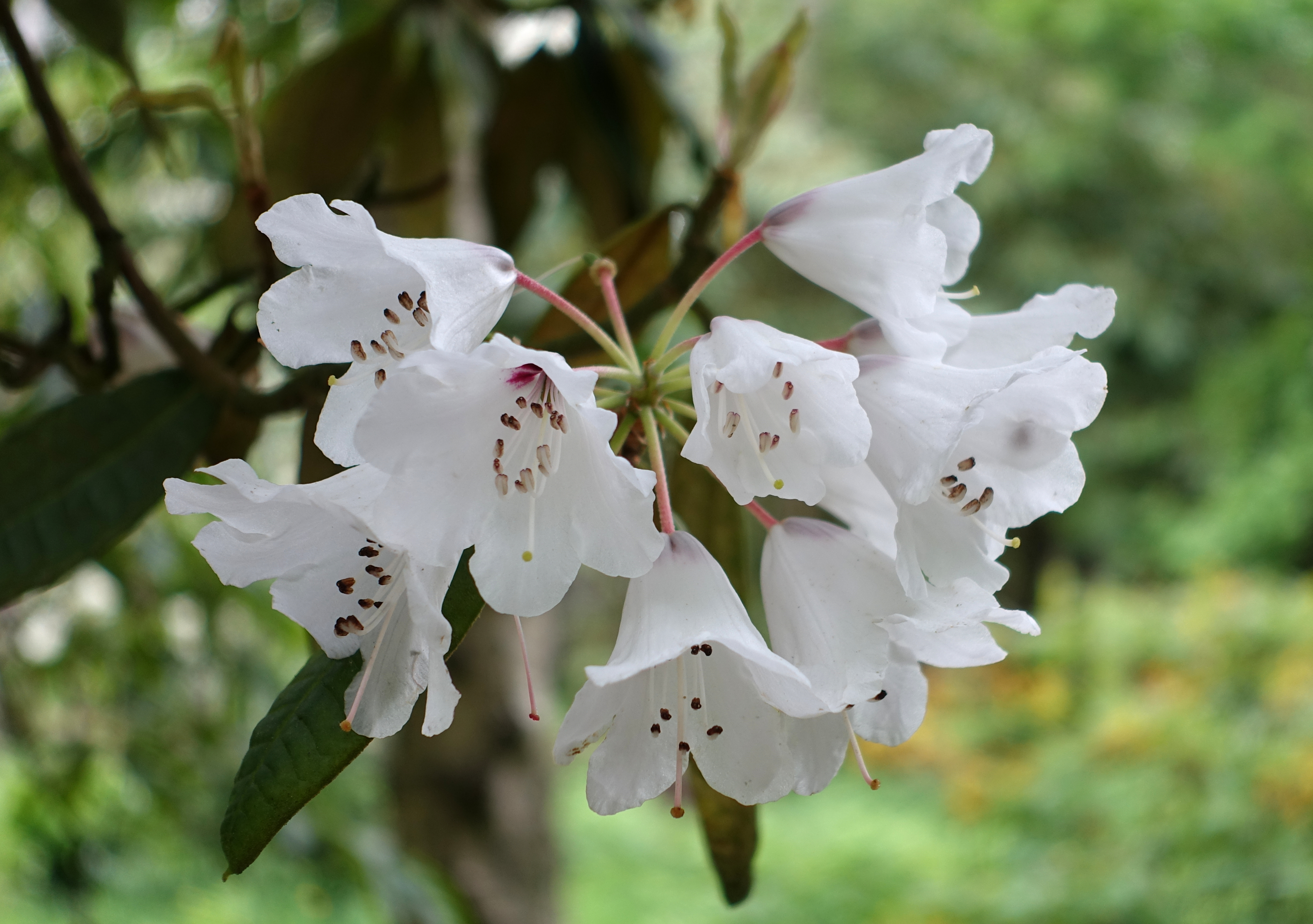

Scientific classification
- Kingdom: Plantae
- Clade: Tracheophytes
- Clade: Angiosperms
- Clade: Eudicots
- Clade: Asterids
- Order: Ericales
- Family: Ericaceae
- Genus: Rhododendron
- Species: R. galactinum

Binomial name
- Rhododendron galactinum Balf.f. ex Tagg

= Rhododendron galactinum =

Species of plant

Rhododendron galactinum (乳黄叶杜鹃) is a species of flowering plant in the family Ericaceae. It is native to western Sichuan in China, where it grows at altitudes of 2,900–3,500 m (9,500–11,500 ft). It is a hardy evergreen tree that grows to 5–8 m (16–26 ft) in height, with leathery leaves that are oblong-elliptic, oblong-obovate or broadly lanceolate, 11–22 by 5–7 cm in size. The flowers are white to pale pink with a crimson basal blotch.

== Sources ==
- "Rhododendron galactinum", I. B. Balfour ex Tagg, Notes Roy. Bot. Gard. Edinburgh. 15: 103. 1926.
