= Plocama thymoides =

Conservation status
- Endangered (IUCN 3.1)

Scientific classification
- Kingdom: Plantae
- Clade: Tracheophytes
- Clade: Angiosperms
- Clade: Eudicots
- Clade: Asterids
- Order: Gentianales
- Family: Rubiaceae
- Genus: Plocama
- Species: P. thymoides

Binomial name
- Plocama thymoides (Balf.f.) M.Backlund & Thulin (2007)

Synonyms
- Gaillonia thymoides Balf.f. (1882); Neogaillonia thymoides (Balf.f.) Lincz. (1973)

Species of plant

Plocama thymoides is a species of flowering plant in the family Rubiaceae. It is a subshrub or shrub endemic to the island of Socotra in Yemen. It grows in semi-deciduous woodland on the limestone plateau and escarpment above Qalansiyah in northwestern Socotra from 350 to 700 metres elevation. It is listed as an endangered species by the IUCN under the basionym Gaillonia thymoides.
