= Sideroxylon fimbriatum =

Conservation status
- Vulnerable (IUCN 3.1)

Scientific classification
- Kingdom: Plantae
- Clade: Tracheophytes
- Clade: Angiosperms
- Clade: Eudicots
- Clade: Asterids
- Order: Ericales
- Family: Sapotaceae
- Genus: Sideroxylon
- Species: S. fimbriatum

Binomial name
- Sideroxylon fimbriatum Balf.f. (1883)

Synonyms
- Calvaria fimbriata (Balf.f.) Dubard (1912); Mastichodendron fimbriatum (Balf.f.) Baehni (1965)

Species of plant

Sideroxylon fimbriatum is a species of plant in the family Sapotaceae. It is a tree endemic to the Hajhir Mountains on the island of Socotra in Yemen. It is uncommon in dense montane woodland from 550 to 1,300 metres elevation.
