= Hibiscus quattenensis =

Conservation status
- Least Concern (IUCN 3.1)

Scientific classification
- Kingdom: Plantae
- Clade: Tracheophytes
- Clade: Angiosperms
- Clade: Eudicots
- Clade: Rosids
- Order: Malvales
- Family: Malvaceae
- Genus: Hibiscus
- Species: H. quattenensis

Binomial name
- Hibiscus quattenensis A.G.Mill.

Species of flowering plant

Hibiscus quattenensis is a species of flowering plant in the genus Hibiscus, in the family Malvaceae. It is endemic to the island of Socotra in Yemen. It is common on the coastal plains and dry limestone foothills and plateaus of southwestern Socotra from sea level to 600 metres elevation, where it grows in Croton socotranus shrubland and succulent shrubland.
