= Hibiscus malacophyllus =

Conservation status
- Vulnerable (IUCN 3.1)

Scientific classification
- Kingdom: Plantae
- Clade: Tracheophytes
- Clade: Angiosperms
- Clade: Eudicots
- Clade: Rosids
- Order: Malvales
- Family: Malvaceae
- Genus: Hibiscus
- Species: H. malacophyllus

Binomial name
- Hibiscus malacophyllus Balf.f.

Species of plant

Hibiscus malacophyllus is a species of flowering plant in the family Malvaceae. It endemic to the island of Socotra in Yemen, where it grows in drought-deciduous woodland and succulent shrubland on limestone from 100 to 600 metres elevation.
