= Panicum rigidum =

Conservation status
- Least Concern (IUCN 3.1)

Scientific classification
- Kingdom: Plantae
- Clade: Tracheophytes
- Clade: Angiosperms
- Clade: Monocots
- Clade: Commelinids
- Order: Poales
- Family: Poaceae
- Subfamily: Panicoideae
- Genus: Panicum
- Species: P. rigidum

Binomial name
- Panicum rigidum Balf.f. (1883)

Species of plant

Panicum rigidum is a species of grass in the family Poaceae. It is a perennial endemic to the islands of Socotra, Samhah, and Abd al Kuri in the Socotra Archipelago, located off the coast of east Africa and politically part of Yemen. It grows in dwarf shrubland and woody-herb communities on desertic plains and rocky slopes from sea level to 600 metres elevation.
