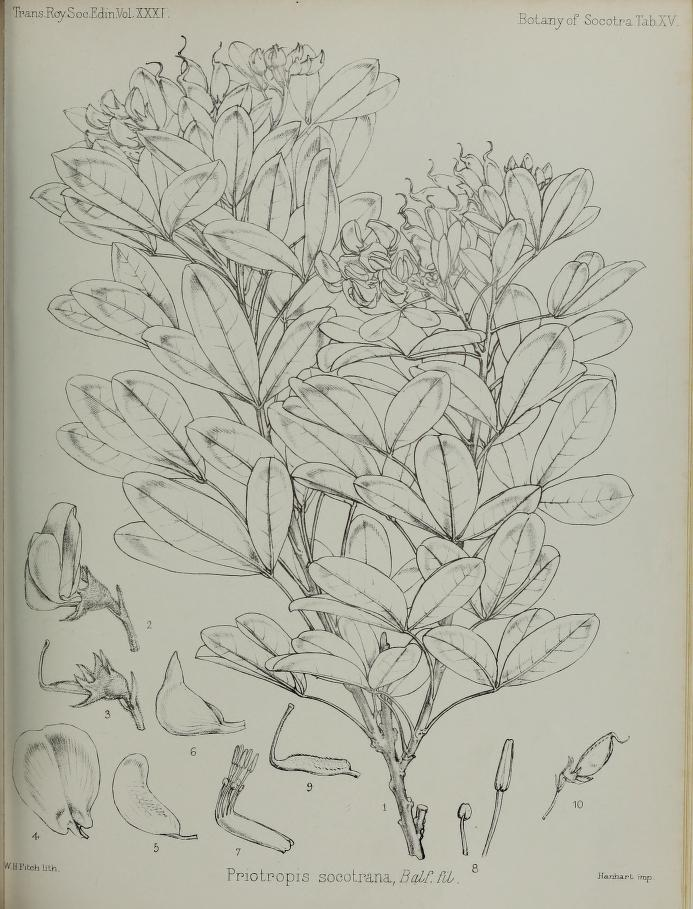

Conservation status
- Vulnerable (IUCN 3.1)

Scientific classification
- Kingdom: Plantae
- Clade: Tracheophytes
- Clade: Angiosperms
- Clade: Eudicots
- Clade: Rosids
- Order: Fabales
- Family: Fabaceae
- Subfamily: Faboideae
- Genus: Crotalaria
- Species: C. socotrana

Binomial name
- Crotalaria socotrana Balf.f. Thulin

Synonyms
- Priotropis socotrana Balf.f.

= Crotalaria socotrana =

Species of plant

Crotalaria socotrana is a species of plant in the family Fabaceae. It is endemic to north-central Socotra in Yemen. Its natural habitat is subtropical or tropical dry forests.
