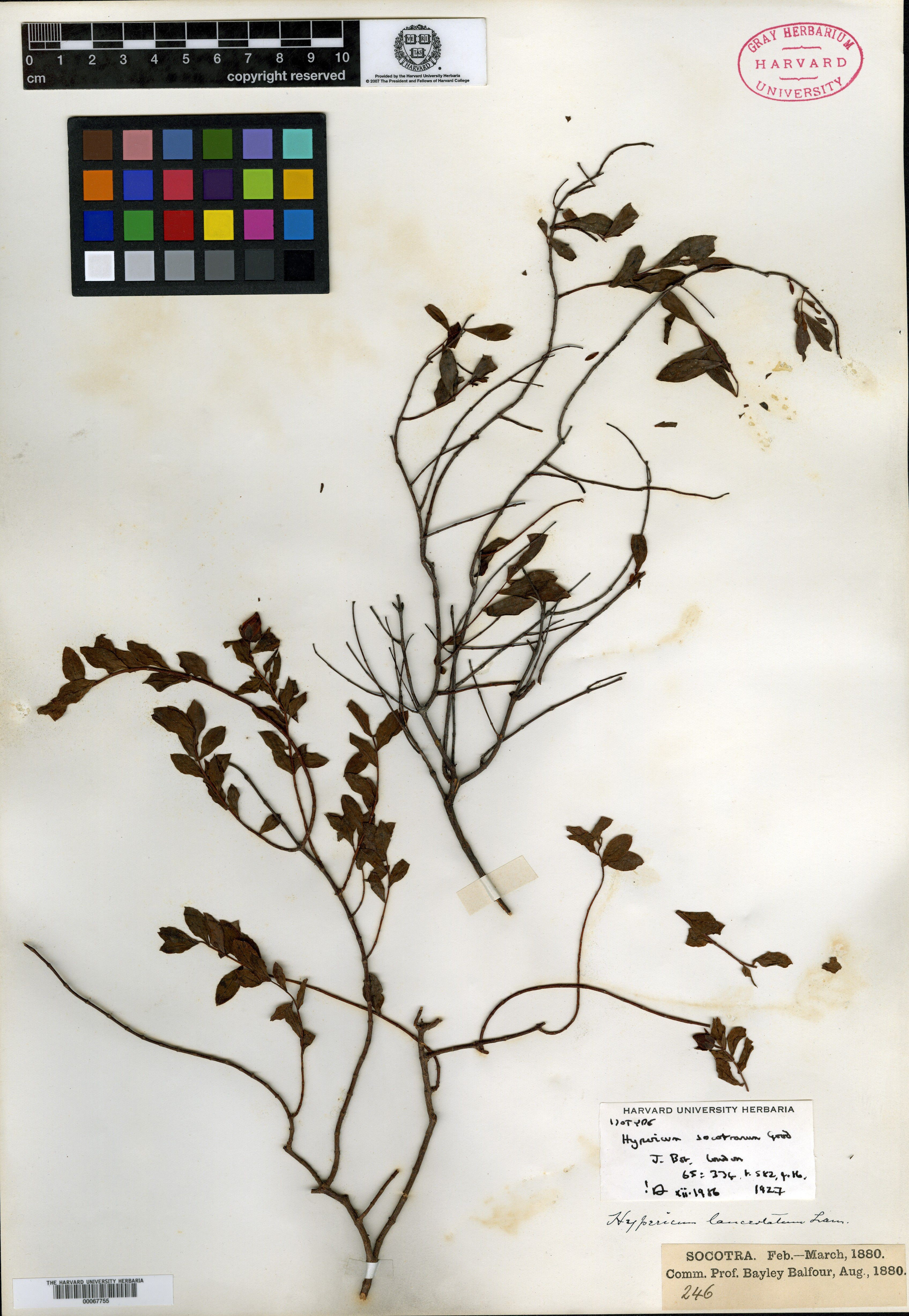

Conservation status
- Endangered (IUCN 3.1)

Scientific classification
- Kingdom: Plantae
- Clade: Tracheophytes
- Clade: Angiosperms
- Clade: Eudicots
- Clade: Rosids
- Order: Malpighiales
- Family: Hypericaceae
- Genus: Hypericum
- Section: Hypericum sect. Camplyosporus
- Species: H. socotranum

Binomial name
- Hypericum socotranum R.D.Good

Synonyms
- Hypericum lanceolatum Balf.f.

= Hypericum socotranum =

Species of flowering plant

Hypericum socotranum is a species of flowering plant in the Hypericaceae family which is endemic to the island of Socotra in Yemen. Its natural habitats are subtropical or tropical dry forests and rocky areas.

== Description ==
The stem has internodes which are 4–16 mm (0.16–0.63 in) long. They are shorter than the leaves which are 12–24 mm (0.47–0.94 in) long and 5–10 mm (0.20–0.39 in) wide in an elliptic to oblanceolate shape. The leaves are acute or apiculate to obtuse and usually have one to three basal veins, though they can sometimes have five. Additionally, there are gland dots on the leaves which are visible on the dorsal surface.

The inflorescence has only one flower with a pedicel that is 1–6 mm (0.039–0.236 in) long. The sepals are 5–6.5 mm (0.20–0.26 in) long and 2.5–3 mm (0.098–0.118 in) wide and are apiculate to obtuse. The flower petals are 15–30 mm (0.59–1.18 in) long and 9–15 mm (0.35–0.59 in) wide. The stamen fascicles are 8–12 mm (0.31–0.47 in) long. The ovary is ovoid-conic in shape, with coherent styles. The seed capsule measures 12–13 mm (0.47–0.51 in) long by 6–7 mm (0.24–0.28 in) wide. The pollen grains of the species are all tricolporate, meaning they have three grooves in a roughly triangular layout.

== Taxonomy ==
=== Infraspecifics ===
- Hypericum socotranum subsp. smithii N.Robson
- Hypericum socotranum subsp. socotranum

== Ecology ==
=== Pollination ===
Hypericum socotranum, unlike most Hypericum species, has no irregular pollen grains in its pollen makeup. Additionally, the species has a rather high rate of total fertility at over 90%; however, this high rate of fertility has not been proven to be correlated with the lack of irregular grains.

== Conservation ==
Hypericum socotranum was first assessed by the IUCN in 2004, and its assessment was updated in 2020. Both of these assessments by determined that the species was secure and of Least Concern to the organization. In Socotra, the species was widely observed in numerous habitats and had no perceivable environmental threats. However, the subspecies socotranum is considered to be Endangered by the IUCN. The rationale behind this classification is the fact that there have only been two collections of the subspecies from a very restricted area, and the fact that the habitat of the species is particularly threatened by lower rainfall in the region due to climate change.
