= Crotalaria strigulosa =

Conservation status
- Least Concern (IUCN 3.1)

Scientific classification
- Kingdom: Plantae
- Clade: Tracheophytes
- Clade: Angiosperms
- Clade: Eudicots
- Clade: Rosids
- Order: Fabales
- Family: Fabaceae
- Subfamily: Faboideae
- Genus: Crotalaria
- Species: C. strigulosa

Binomial name
- Crotalaria strigulosa Balf.f.

Synonyms
- Crotalaria abdal-kuriensis Vierh. Crotalaria kuriensis Vierh. Crotalaria schweinfurthii Vierh.

Species of plant

Crotalaria strigulosa is a species of plant in the family Fabaceae. It is native to the islands of Socotra and Abd al Kuri in the Socotra Archipelago of Yemen.
