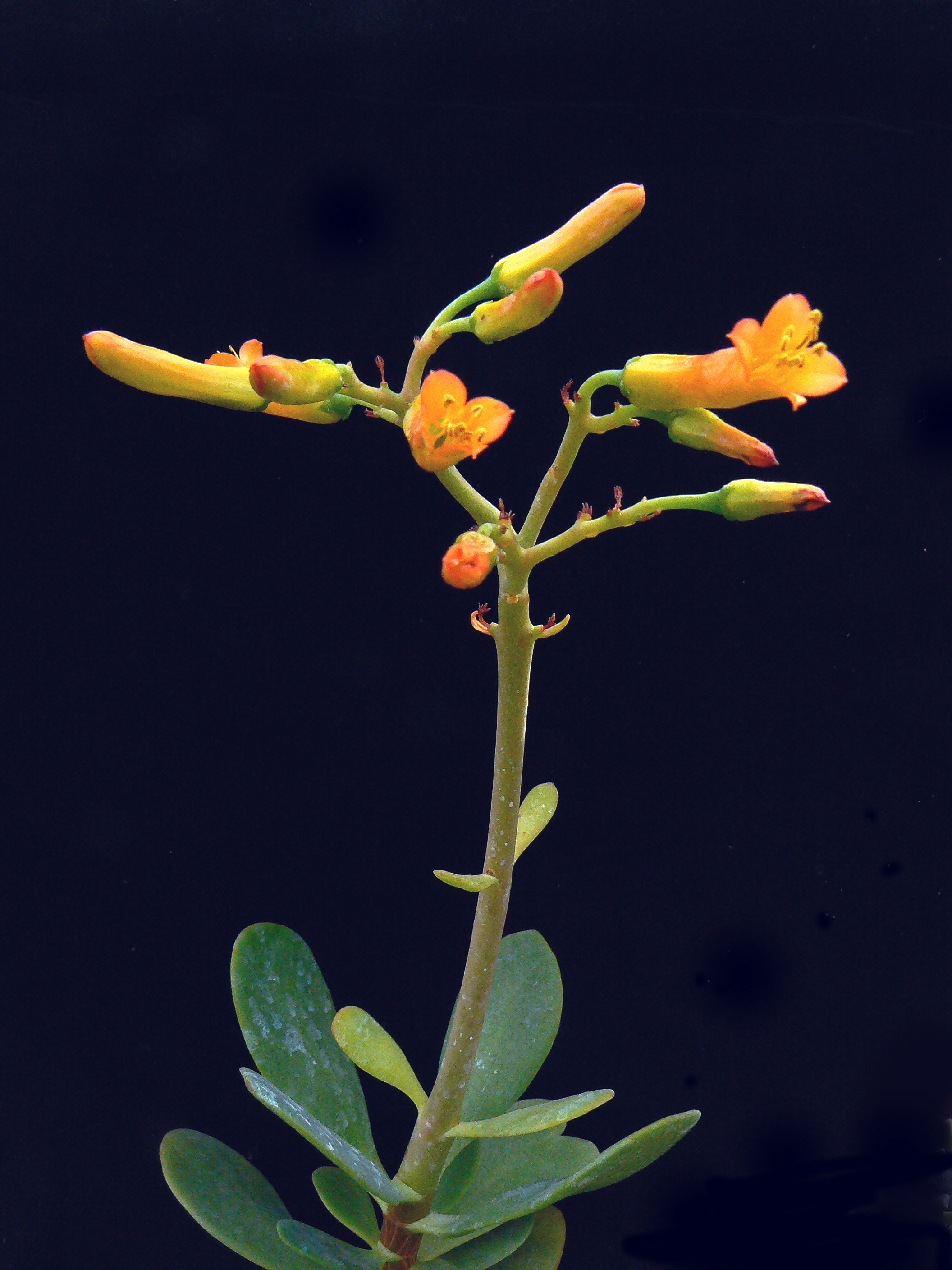

Conservation status
- Vulnerable (IUCN 3.1)

Scientific classification
- Kingdom: Plantae
- Clade: Tracheophytes
- Clade: Angiosperms
- Clade: Eudicots
- Order: Saxifragales
- Family: Crassulaceae
- Genus: Kalanchoe
- Species: K. robusta

Binomial name
- Kalanchoe robusta Balf.f.

Synonyms
- Kalanchoe abrupta Balf.f.

= Kalanchoe robusta =

Species of plant

Kalanchoe robusta is a species of plant in the family Crassulaceae. It is endemic to the Yemeni island of Socotra. Its natural habitat is on rocky slopes and amongst limestone boulders in dwarf shrubland and low succulent shrubland at elevations of 300–750 m. While it is listed by IUCN as belonging to the order Rosales, Kalanchoes and other Crassulaceae are more usually placed in Saxifragales.
