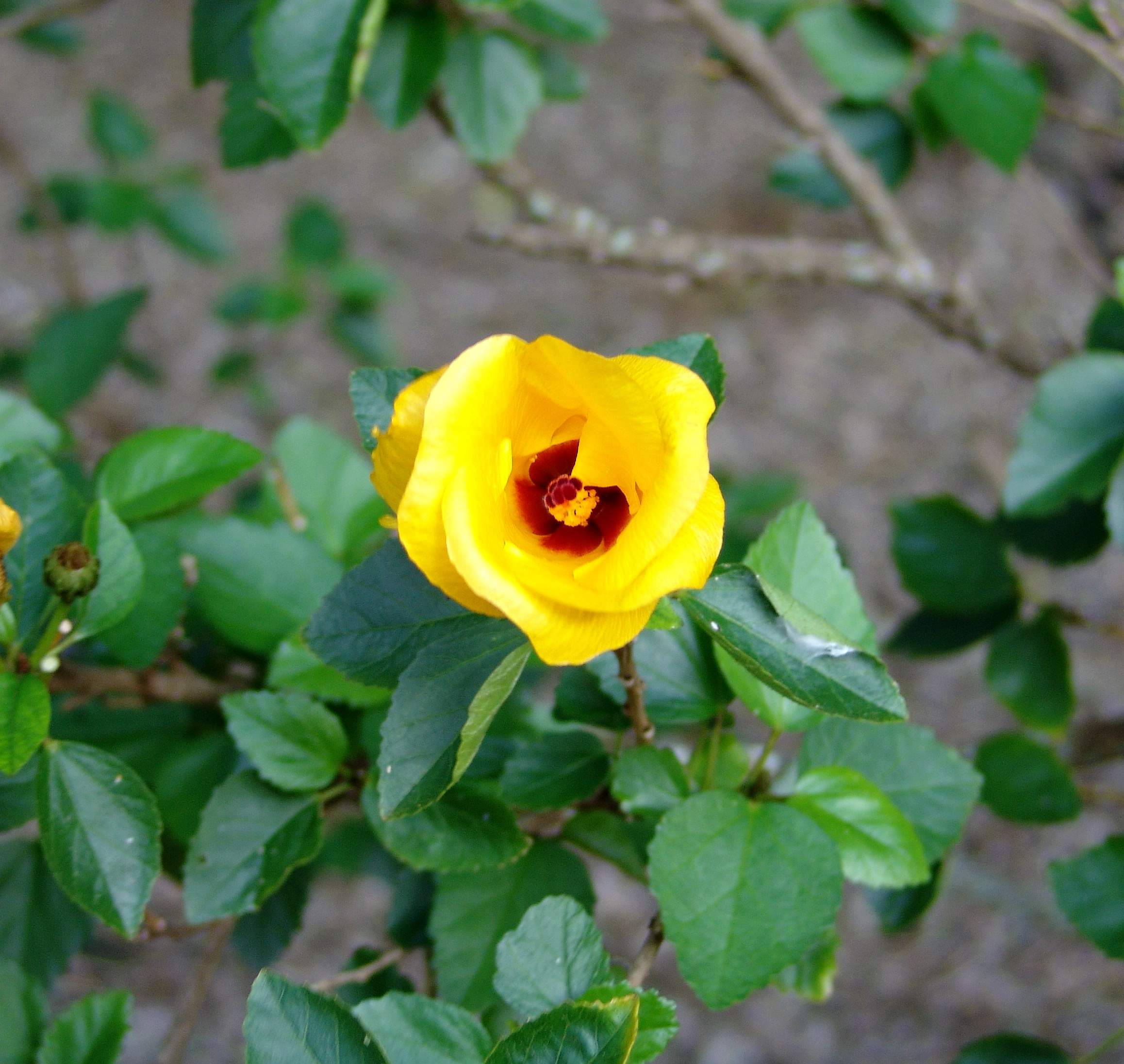

Conservation status
- Vulnerable (IUCN 3.1)

Scientific classification
- Kingdom: Plantae
- Clade: Tracheophytes
- Clade: Angiosperms
- Clade: Eudicots
- Clade: Rosids
- Order: Malvales
- Family: Malvaceae
- Genus: Hibiscus
- Species: H. scottii

Binomial name
- Hibiscus scottii Balf.f.

= Hibiscus scottii =

Species of plant

Hibiscus scottii is a species of flowering plant in the family Malvaceae. It is found only in Yemen. Its natural habitat is subtropical or tropical dry forests.
