= Euphorbia schweinfurthii =

Conservation status
- Data Deficient (IUCN 3.1)

Scientific classification
- Kingdom: Plantae
- Clade: Tracheophytes
- Clade: Angiosperms
- Clade: Eudicots
- Clade: Rosids
- Order: Malpighiales
- Family: Euphorbiaceae
- Genus: Euphorbia
- Species: E. schweinfurthii

Binomial name
- Euphorbia schweinfurthii Balf.f.

Species of plant

Euphorbia schweinfurthii is a species of plant in the family Euphorbiaceae. It is endemic to Socotra in Yemen. Its natural habitat is subtropical or tropical dry shrubland.
