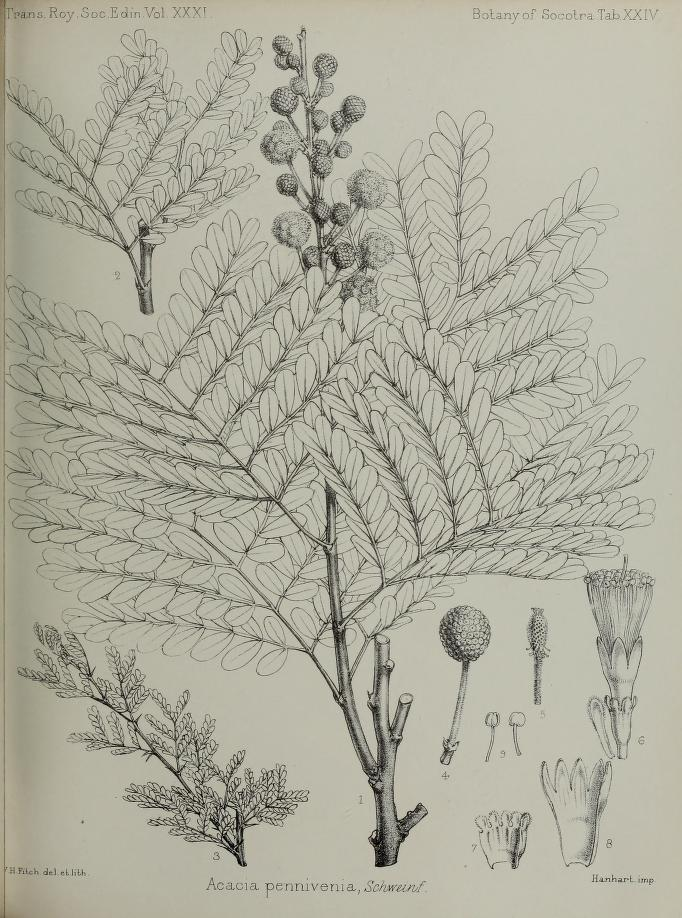

Conservation status
- Near Threatened (IUCN 3.1)

Scientific classification
- Kingdom: Plantae
- Clade: Tracheophytes
- Clade: Angiosperms
- Clade: Eudicots
- Clade: Rosids
- Order: Fabales
- Family: Fabaceae
- Subfamily: Caesalpinioideae
- Clade: Mimosoid clade
- Genus: Vachellia
- Species: V. pennivenia

Binomial name
- Vachellia pennivenia (Balf.f.) F.L.Anderson & Knees (2019)

Synonyms
- Acacia pennivenia Balf.f. (1884)

= Vachellia pennivenia =

Species of plant

Vachellia pennivenia is a species of legume in the family Fabaceae. It is a shrub or tree endemic to the island of Socotra in Yemen. It is widespread in drought-deciduous woodland from 50 to 650 metres elevation.
