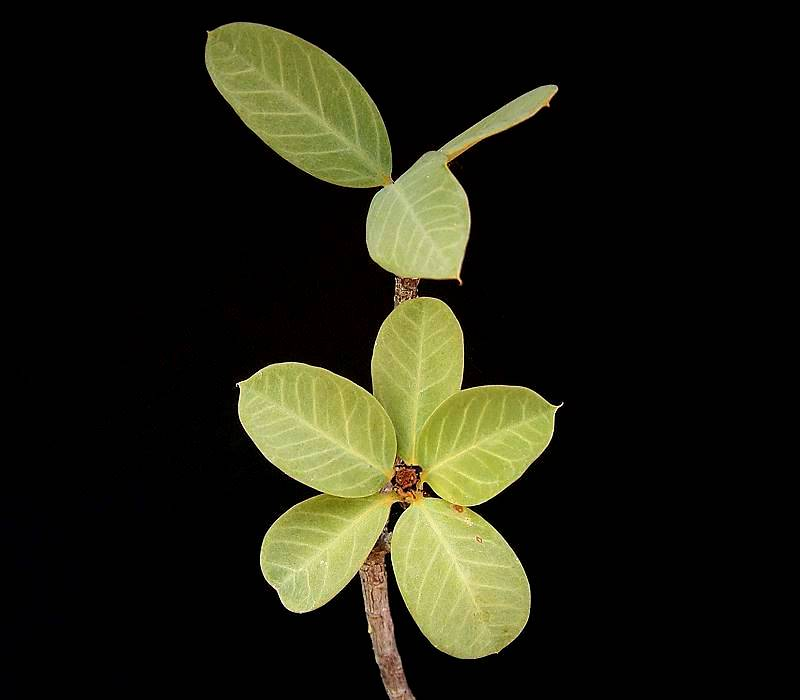

Conservation status
- Vulnerable (IUCN 3.1)

Scientific classification
- Kingdom: Plantae
- Clade: Tracheophytes
- Clade: Angiosperms
- Clade: Eudicots
- Clade: Rosids
- Order: Malpighiales
- Family: Euphorbiaceae
- Genus: Euphorbia
- Species: E. socotrana

Binomial name
- Euphorbia socotrana Balf.f.

Subspecies
- Euphorbia socotrana subsp. purpurea N.Kilian & P.Hein; Euphorbia socotrana subsp. socotrana

= Euphorbia socotrana =

Species of plant

Euphorbia socotrana (Soqotri šeber) is a species of plant in the family Euphorbiaceae. It is a tree or shrub endemic to Socotra in Yemen.

It has glaucous leaves clustered at the branch tips, and pale brown or almost white bark. Its leaves persist into the dry season, and it drops its leaves in the summer and re-leafs when the rains return.

It is common in succulent shrubland and semi-deciduous dry woodland on limestone plateaus, and less common in montane semi-deciduous woodland on granite in the Hajhir Mountains, from 450 to 900 meters elevation. Its population in the western Hajhir is observed to be increasing.

Two subspecies are accepted.

- Euphorbia socotrana subsp. purpurea N.Kilian & P.Hein
- Euphorbia socotrana subsp. socotrana
