= Hibiscus socotranus =

Conservation status
- Endangered (IUCN 3.1)

Scientific classification
- Kingdom: Plantae
- Clade: Tracheophytes
- Clade: Angiosperms
- Clade: Eudicots
- Clade: Rosids
- Order: Malvales
- Family: Malvaceae
- Genus: Hibiscus
- Species: H. socotranus

Binomial name
- Hibiscus socotranus G.Ll.Lucas

Species of flowering plant

Hibiscus socotranus is a species of flowering plant in the family Malvaceae. It is endemic to the island of Socotra in Yemen. It grows in open deciduous succulent shrubland on a limestone escarpment at the western end of the island.

It is distinguished from other Socotran Hibiscus species by its low-growing habit and its fused epicalyx.
