= Aloe forbesii =

Conservation status
- CITES Appendix II (CITES)

Scientific classification
- Kingdom: Plantae
- Clade: Tracheophytes
- Clade: Angiosperms
- Clade: Monocots
- Order: Asparagales
- Family: Asphodelaceae
- Subfamily: Asphodeloideae
- Genus: Aloe
- Species: A. forbesii

Binomial name
- Aloe forbesii Balf.f.

Species of plant

Aloe forbesii is a small stemless Aloe native to Socotra, Yemen.
