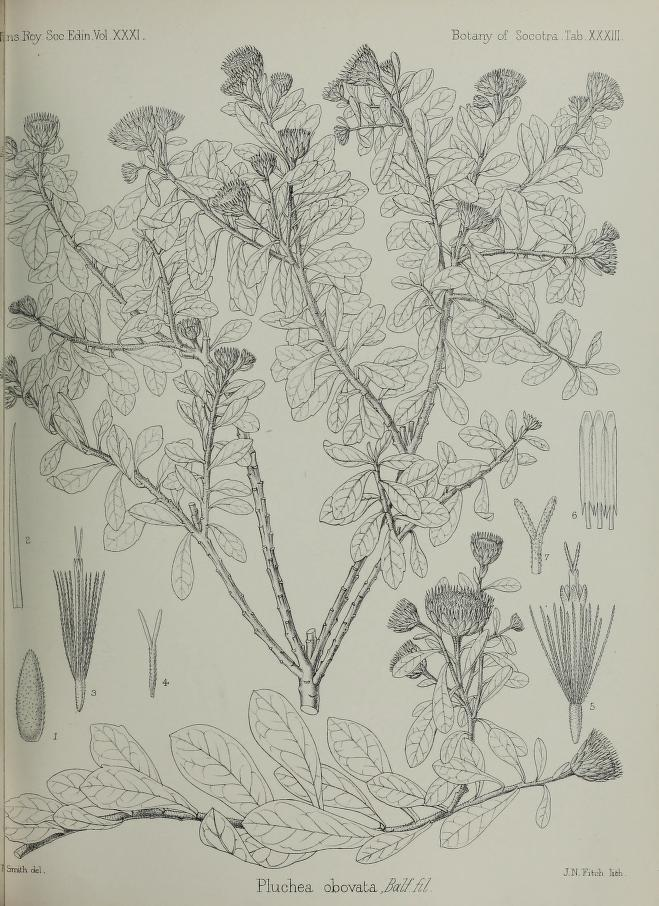

Conservation status
- Vulnerable (IUCN 3.1)

Scientific classification
- Kingdom: Plantae
- Clade: Tracheophytes
- Clade: Angiosperms
- Clade: Eudicots
- Clade: Asterids
- Order: Asterales
- Family: Asteraceae
- Genus: Pluchea
- Species: P. obovata

Binomial name
- Pluchea obovata Balf.f.

= Pluchea obovata =

Species of plant

Pluchea obovata is a species of flowering plant in the family Asteraceae. It is endemic to Socotra. Its natural habitat is rocky areas.
