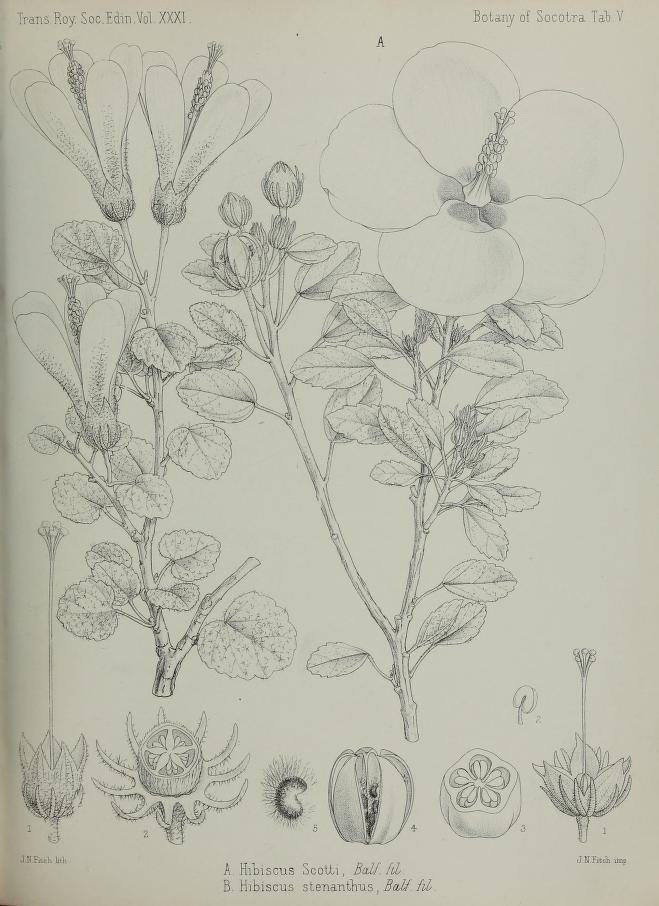

Conservation status
- Least Concern (IUCN 3.1)

Scientific classification
- Kingdom: Plantae
- Clade: Tracheophytes
- Clade: Angiosperms
- Clade: Eudicots
- Clade: Rosids
- Order: Malvales
- Family: Malvaceae
- Genus: Hibiscus
- Species: H. stenanthus

Binomial name
- Hibiscus stenanthus Balf.f.

= Hibiscus stenanthus =

Species of plant

Hibiscus stenanthus is a species of flowering plant in the family Malvaceae. It is endemic to the island of Socotra in Yemen. Its grows in rocky areas of the limestone plateau in the northeastern portion of the island, from 350 to 600 metres elevation.

It is a low shrub, and nearly prostrate in windy areas. It is distinguished from other Socotran Hibiscus by its tubular corolla with red stigmas and without a red base, a cylindrical calyx, and anthers limited to the top quarter of the staminal column.
