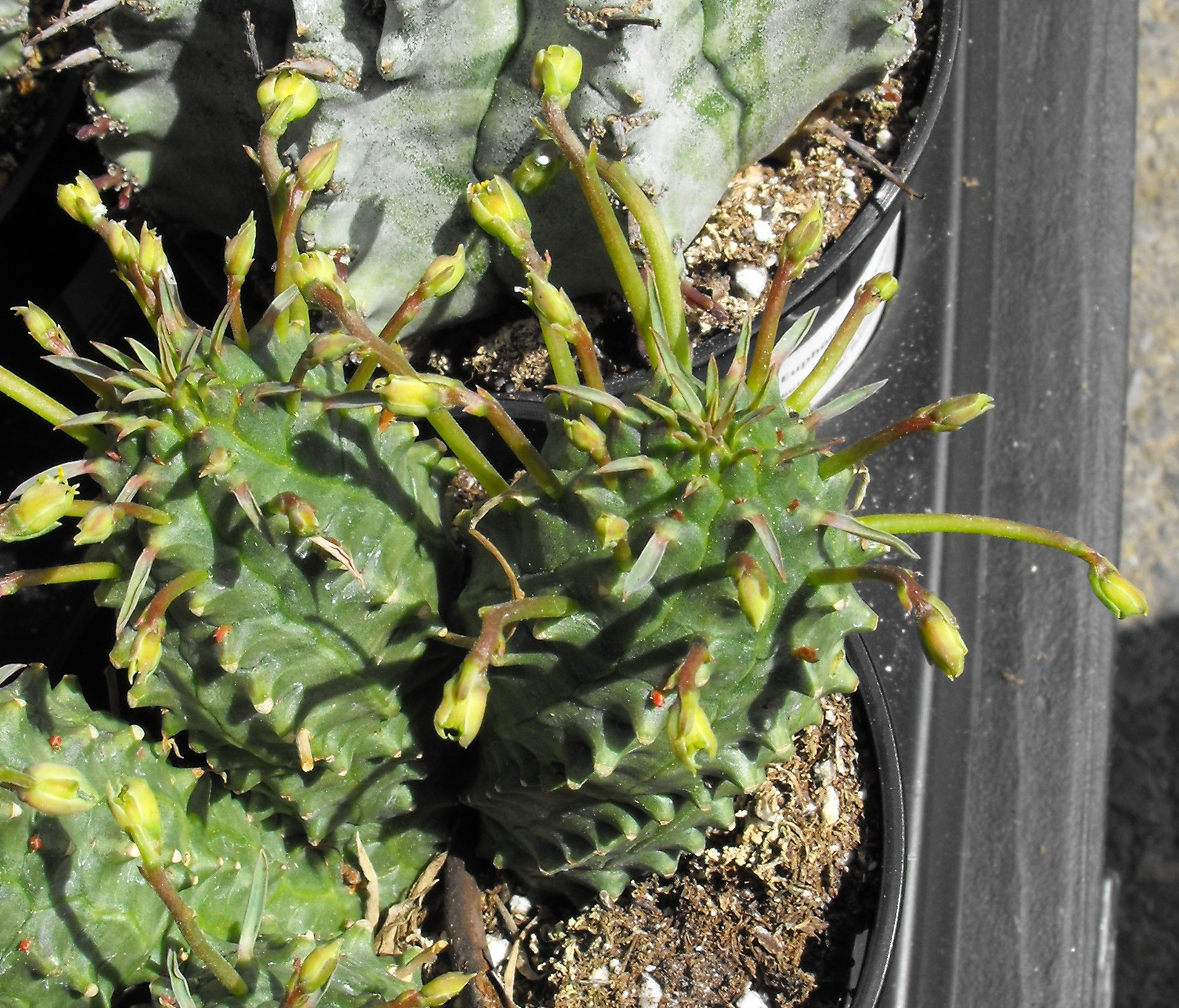

Conservation status
- Least Concern (IUCN 3.1)

Scientific classification
- Kingdom: Plantae
- Clade: Tracheophytes
- Clade: Angiosperms
- Clade: Eudicots
- Clade: Rosids
- Order: Malpighiales
- Family: Euphorbiaceae
- Genus: Euphorbia
- Species: E. spiralis

Binomial name
- Euphorbia spiralis Balf.f.

Synonyms
- Euphorbia septemsulcata Vierh.

= Euphorbia spiralis =

Species of plant

Euphorbia spiralis is a species of plant in the family Euphorbiaceae. It is a succulent subshrub or shrub endemic to Socotra in Yemen.
