= Hibiscus noli-tangere =

Conservation status
- Endangered (IUCN 3.1)

Scientific classification
- Kingdom: Plantae
- Clade: Tracheophytes
- Clade: Angiosperms
- Clade: Eudicots
- Clade: Rosids
- Order: Malvales
- Family: Malvaceae
- Genus: Hibiscus
- Species: H. noli-tangere

Binomial name
- Hibiscus noli-tangere A.G.Mill.

Species of flowering plant

Hibiscus noli-tangere is a species of flowering plant in the family Malvaceae. It is endemic to the island of Socotra, which is part of Yemen. Its natural habitat is tropical dry forest. It is threatened by habitat loss.

Noli me tangere ('touch me not') is the Latin version of a phrase spoken, according to John 20:17, by Jesus to Mary Magdalene when she recognized him after his resurrection. The biblical scene gave birth to a long series of depictions in Christian art from Late Antiquity to the present. H. noli-tangere has sharp glass-like needles that detach from its leaves when touched.
