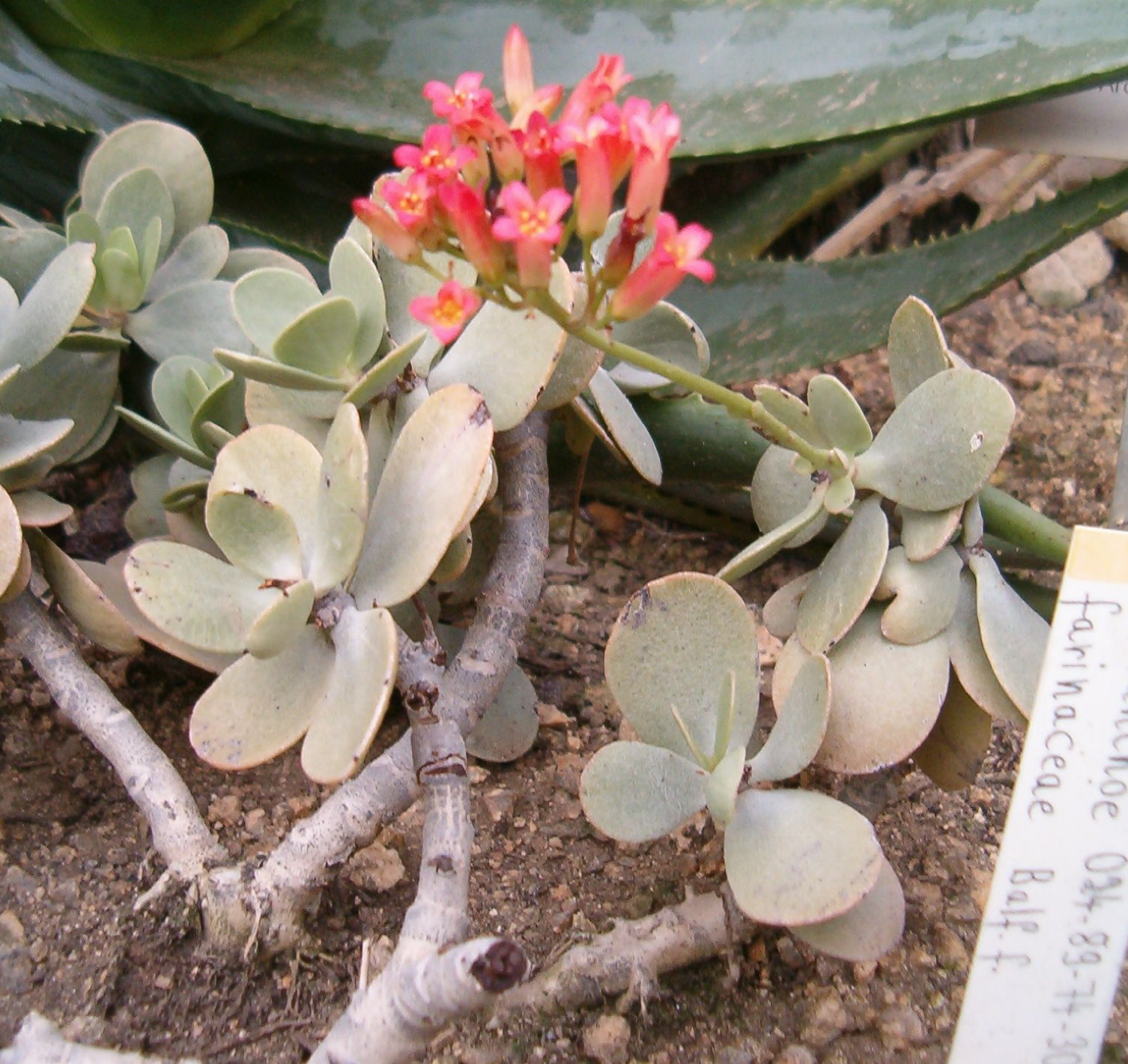

Conservation status
- Least Concern (IUCN 3.1)

Scientific classification
- Kingdom: Plantae
- Clade: Tracheophytes
- Clade: Angiosperms
- Clade: Eudicots
- Order: Saxifragales
- Family: Crassulaceae
- Genus: Kalanchoe
- Species: K. farinacea

Binomial name
- Kalanchoe farinacea Balf.f.

= Kalanchoe farinacea =

Species of plant

Kalanchoe farinacea is a species of plant in the family Crassulaceae. It is endemic to the Yemeni island of Socotra. Its natural habitat is subtropical or tropical dry shrubland at 100-800 m elevation. While it is listed by International Union for Conservation of Nature(IUCN) as belonging to the order Rosales, Kalanchoes and other Crassulaceae are more usually placed in Saxifragales.
