= Convolvulus semhaensis =

Conservation status
- Vulnerable (IUCN 3.1)

Scientific classification
- Kingdom: Plantae
- Clade: Tracheophytes
- Clade: Angiosperms
- Clade: Eudicots
- Clade: Asterids
- Order: Solanales
- Family: Convolvulaceae
- Genus: Convolvulus
- Species: C. semhaensis

Binomial name
- Convolvulus semhaensis (R.R.Mill) J.A.Luna & Carine (2013 publ. 2014)

Synonyms
- Seddera semhaensis R.R.Mill (2009)

Species of flowering plant

Convolvulus semhahensis is a species of plant in the family Convolvulaceae. It is endemic to the island of Samhah in Yemen's Socotra Archipelago. It grows in open dwarf shrubland with Atriplex griffithii from 100 to 200 metres elevation.
