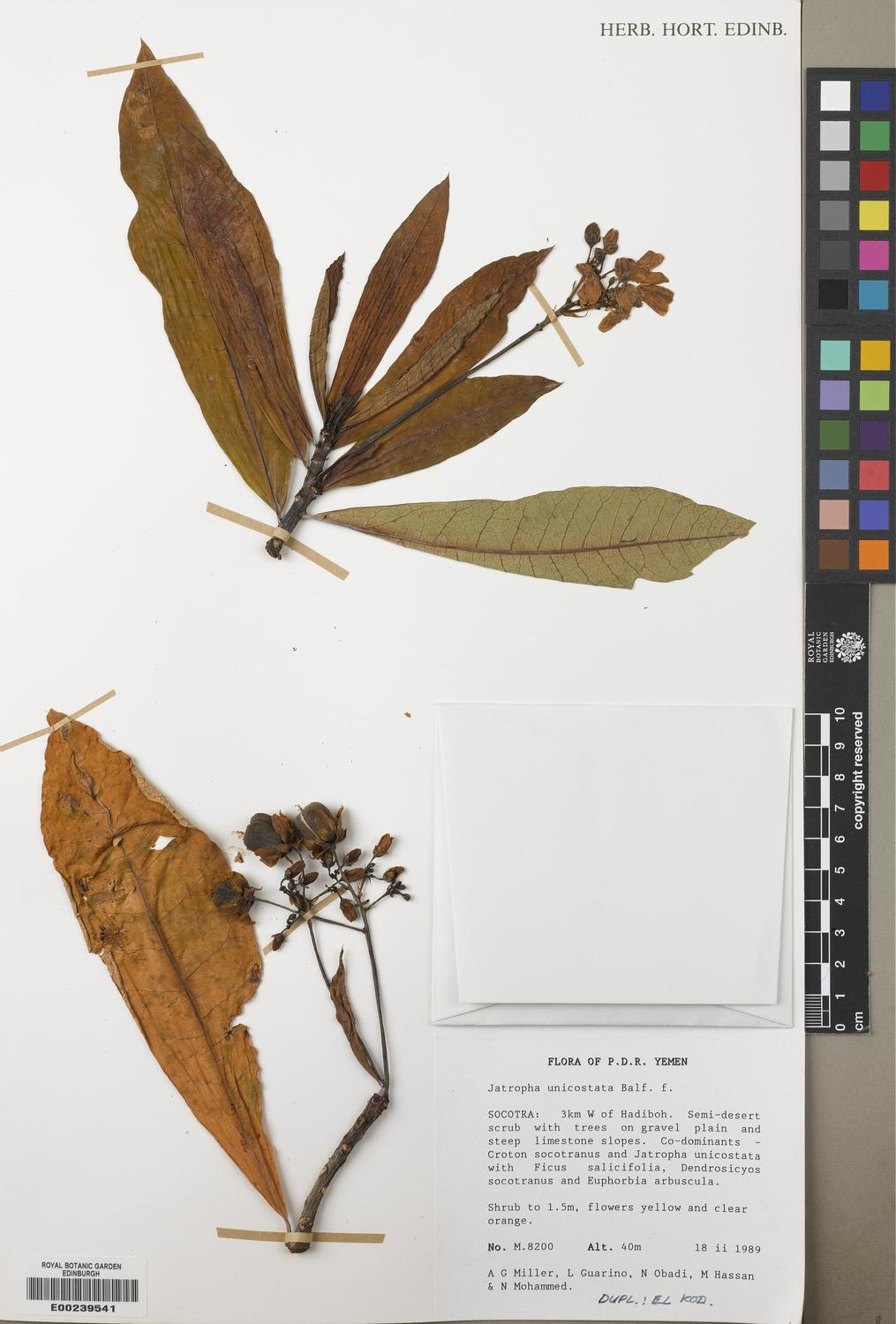

Conservation status
- Least Concern (IUCN 3.1)

Scientific classification
- Kingdom: Plantae
- Clade: Tracheophytes
- Clade: Angiosperms
- Clade: Eudicots
- Clade: Rosids
- Order: Malpighiales
- Family: Euphorbiaceae
- Genus: Jatropha
- Species: J. unicostata

Binomial name
- Jatropha unicostata Balf.f.

= Jatropha unicostata =

Species of plant

Jatropha unicostata is a species of plant in the family Euphorbiaceae. It is endemic to Socotra island Yemen. Its name in Soqotri is "sibru". Its natural habitat is subtropical or tropical dry forests.
