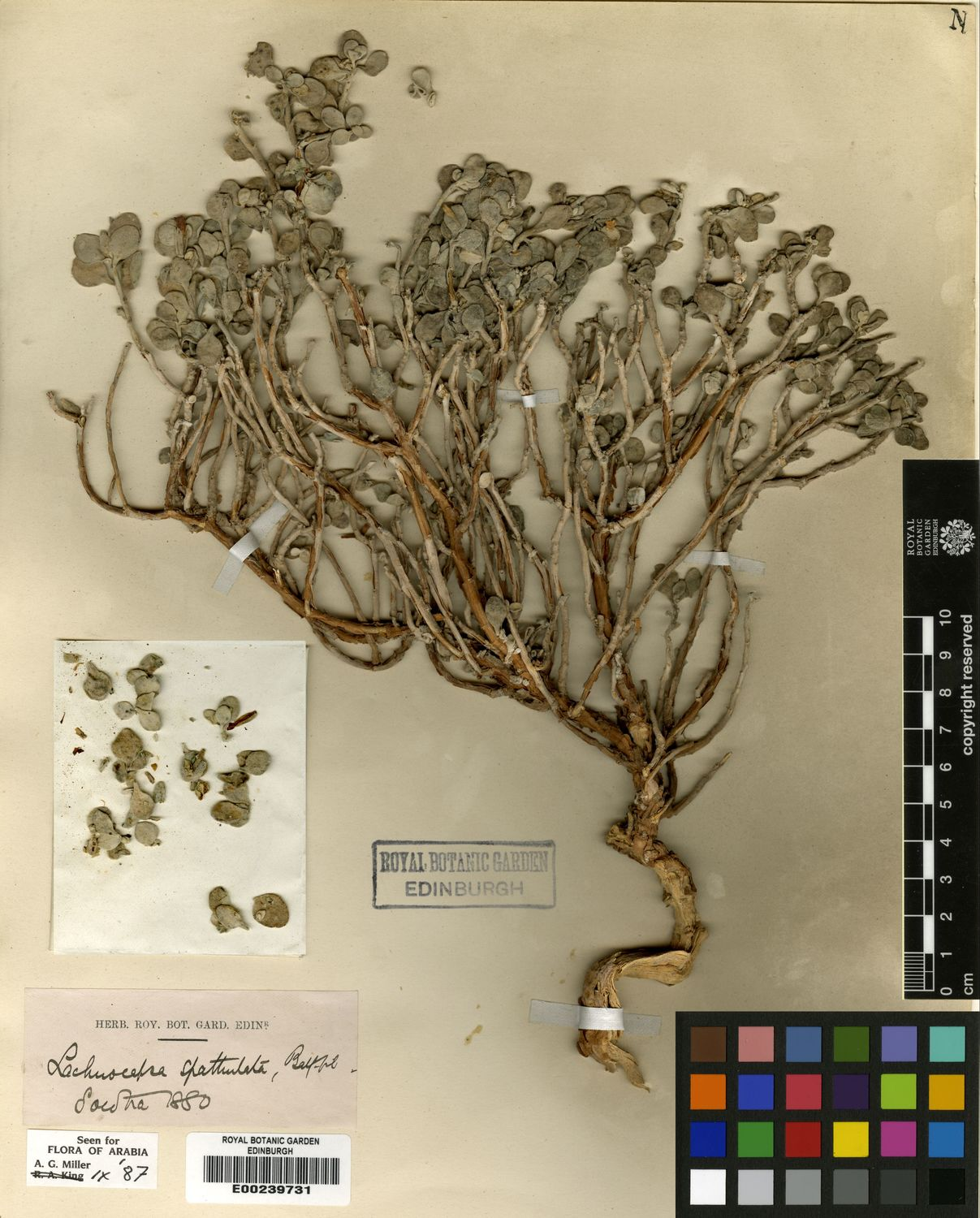

Conservation status
- Vulnerable (IUCN 3.1)

Scientific classification
- Kingdom: Plantae
- Clade: Tracheophytes
- Clade: Angiosperms
- Clade: Eudicots
- Clade: Rosids
- Order: Brassicales
- Family: Brassicaceae
- Genus: Lachnocapsa; Balf.f.
- Species: L. spathulata

Binomial name
- Lachnocapsa spathulata Balf.f.

= Lachnocapsa =

Genus of flowering plants

Lachnocapsa spathulata is a species of flowering plant in the family Brassicaceae, and the only species in the genus Lachnocaspa. It is found only on Socotra, Yemen. Its natural habitats are subtropical or tropical dry shrubland and rocky areas.
