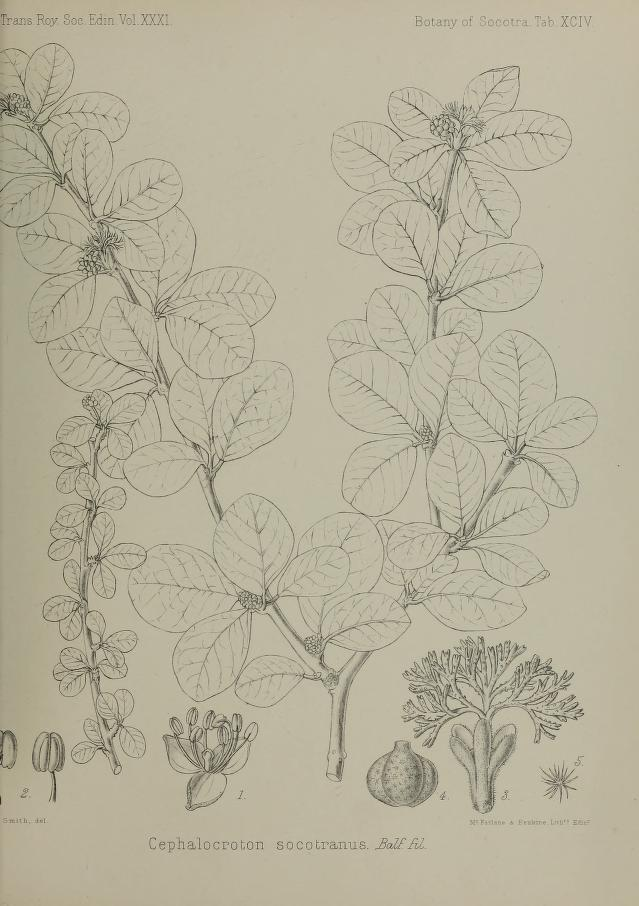
- Cephalocrotonopsis socotranus botanical drawing, 1888

Conservation status
- Vulnerable (IUCN 3.1)

Scientific classification
- Kingdom: Plantae
- Clade: Tracheophytes
- Clade: Angiosperms
- Clade: Eudicots
- Clade: Rosids
- Order: Malpighiales
- Family: Euphorbiaceae
- Subfamily: Acalyphoideae
- Tribe: Epiprineae
- Subtribe: Epiprininae
- Genus: Cephalocrotonopsis; Pax
- Species: C. socotranus

Binomial name
- Cephalocrotonopsis socotranus (Balf.f.) Pax

Synonyms
- Cephalocroton socotranus Balf.f.

= Cephalocrotonopsis =

Species of plant

Cephalocrotonopsis is a genus of plant of the family Euphorbiaceae first described as a genus in 1910. It contains only one known species, Cephalocrotonopsis socotranus, endemic to the Socotra Islands in the Indian Ocean, part of the Republic of Yemen.

The species is listed as vulnerable.
