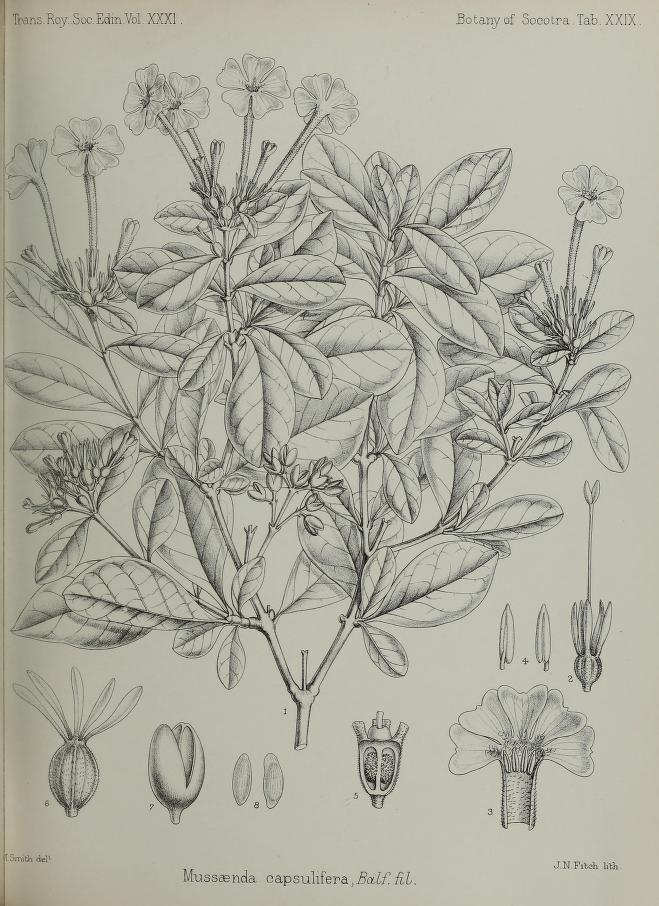

Conservation status
- Least Concern (IUCN 3.1)

Scientific classification
- Kingdom: Plantae
- Clade: Tracheophytes
- Clade: Angiosperms
- Clade: Eudicots
- Clade: Asterids
- Order: Gentianales
- Family: Rubiaceae
- Subfamily: Ixoroideae
- Tribe: Sabiceeae
- Genus: Tamridaea; Thulin & B.Bremer (1998)
- Species: T. capsulifera

Binomial name
- Tamridaea capsulifera (Balf.f.) Thulin & B.Bremer (1998)

Synonyms
- Mussaenda capsulifera Balf.f. (1882); Pseudomussaenda capsulifera (Balf.f.) Wernham (1916)

= Tamridaea =

Species of plant

Tamridaea is a genus of flowering plant in the family Rubiaceae. Its only species is Tamridaea capsulifera. It is a shrub endemic to the island of Socotra in Yemen. It is a small shrub with sweet-smelling jasmine-like flowers and emarginate corolla lobes. It drops leaves in summer and produces new leaves after rain, and flowers in winter. Its natural habitat is rocky areas, both limestone and granite, where it often grows in rock crevices from 100 to 1,100 metres elevation.

The species was first described in as Mussaenda capsulifera by Isaac Bayley Balfour In 1882. It was later and transferred to genus Pseudomussaenda, and in 1998 Mats Thulin and Birgitta Bremer placed it in a new monotypic genus. The name Tamridaea is derived from Tamrida, a former name for Hadiboh, Socotra's capital.
