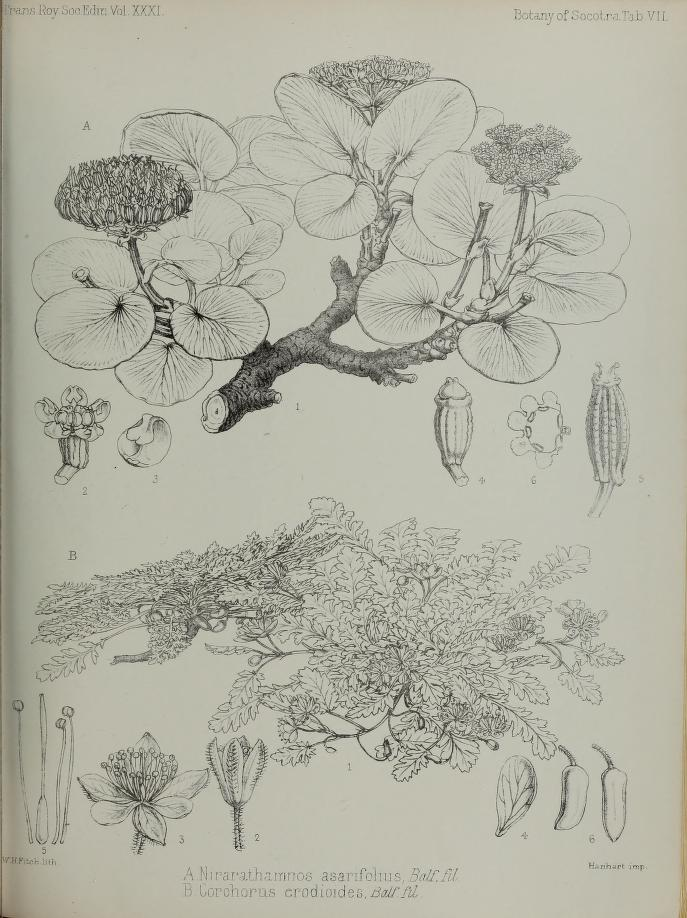

Conservation status
- Vulnerable (IUCN 3.1)

Scientific classification
- Kingdom: Plantae
- Clade: Tracheophytes
- Clade: Angiosperms
- Clade: Eudicots
- Clade: Asterids
- Order: Apiales
- Family: Apiaceae
- Subfamily: Apioideae
- Tribe: Echinophoreae
- Genus: Nirarathamnos; Balf.f.
- Species: N. asarifolius

Binomial name
- Nirarathamnos asarifolius Balf.f.

= Nirarathamnos =

Species of plant

Nirarathamnos asarifolius is a species of flowering plant in the family Apiaceae, and the only species in the genus Nirarathamnos. It is endemic to Socotra. Its natural habitat is rocky areas. It is listed as a vulnerable species on the IUCN Red List.
