= Begonia samhaensis =

Conservation status
- Endangered (IUCN 3.1)

Scientific classification
- Kingdom: Plantae
- Clade: Tracheophytes
- Clade: Angiosperms
- Clade: Eudicots
- Clade: Rosids
- Order: Cucurbitales
- Family: Begoniaceae
- Genus: Begonia
- Species: B. samhaensis

Binomial name
- Begonia samhaensis M.Hughes & A.G.Mill.

Species of flowering plant

Begonia samhaensis is a species in the family Begoniaceae. Similar to Begonia socotrana but separated by the asymmetrically ovate leaves and the unequal tepals in the male flowers; outer tepals broadly orbicular, 1.5–2.2 × 1.7–2.5 cm; inner obovate elliptic, 1.4–2.0 × 0.8 × 1.4 cm.

== Ecology ==
It grows in damp and shady cracks in north-facing limestone cliffs, 600–700 metres (2,000–2,300 ft) on the island of Samhah in the Socotra Archipelago, Yemen. It grows on north facing cliffs on the summit pinnacle and escarpments of the limestone plateau at the centre of Samhah island. Its area of occupation is less than 10 km^{2}. The cliffs where it grows catch precipitation and mists principally from the NE monsoon and represent a unique habitat on Samhah island.

== Botanical notes ==
Unlike B. socotrana, B. samhaensis flowers after rain and is not reliant on short day-length.
