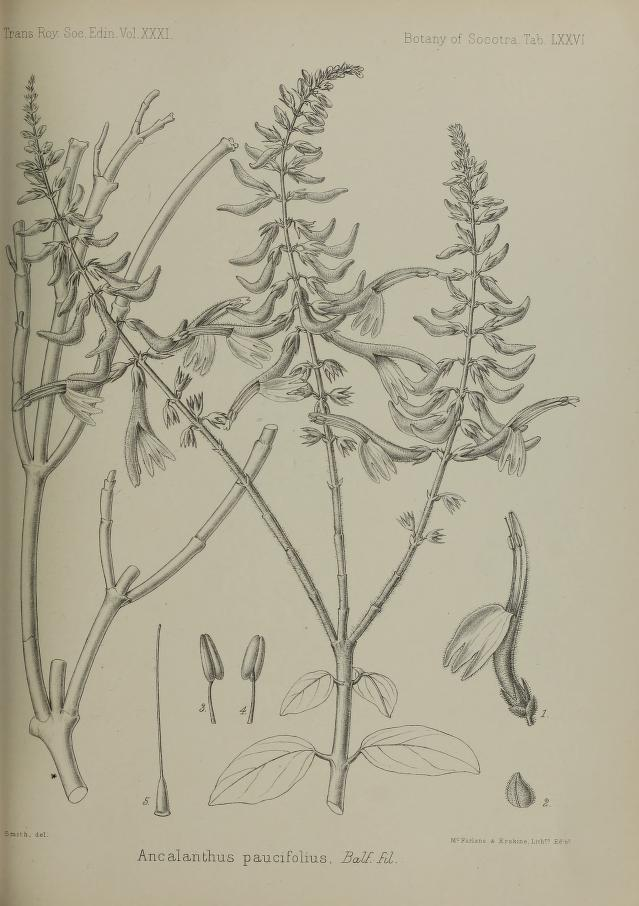

Conservation status
- Endangered (IUCN 3.1)

Scientific classification
- Kingdom: Plantae
- Clade: Embryophytes
- Clade: Tracheophytes
- Clade: Spermatophytes
- Clade: Angiosperms
- Clade: Eudicots
- Clade: Asterids
- Order: Lamiales
- Family: Acanthaceae
- Genus: Angkalanthus; Balf.f. (1883)
- Species: A. oligophylla

Binomial name
- Angkalanthus oligophylla Balf.f. (1883)

Synonyms
- Angkalanthus paucifolius Balf.f. (1888)

= Angkalanthus =

Species of plant

Angkalanthus oligophylla is a species of plant in the family Acanthaceae. It is endemic to the island of Socotra, which is part of Yemen. Its natural habitats are subtropical or tropical dry forests and rocky areas. It is the sole species in genus Angkalanthus.
