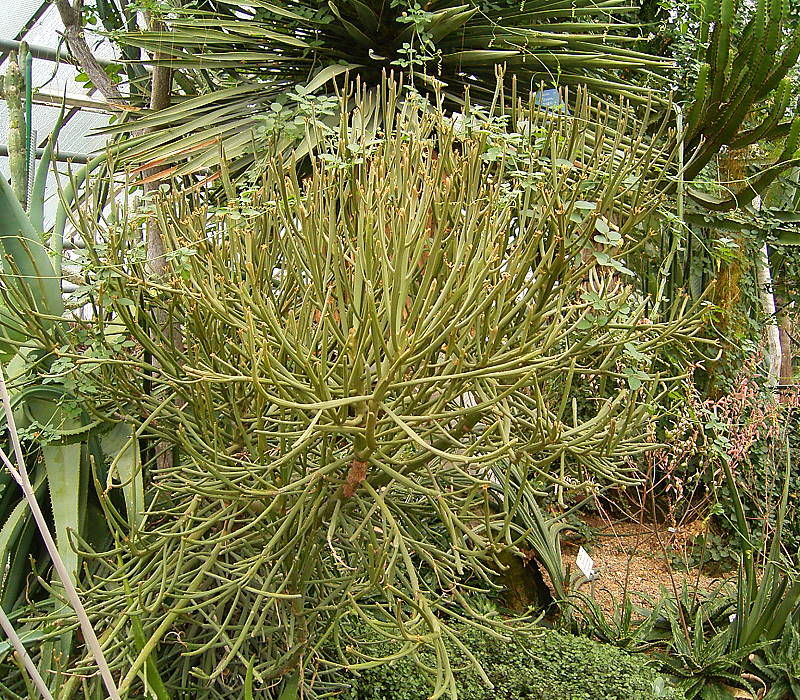

Conservation status
- Near Threatened (IUCN 3.1)

Scientific classification
- Kingdom: Plantae
- Clade: Tracheophytes
- Clade: Angiosperms
- Clade: Eudicots
- Clade: Rosids
- Order: Malpighiales
- Family: Euphorbiaceae
- Genus: Euphorbia
- Species: E. arbuscula

Binomial name
- Euphorbia arbuscula Balf.f.

Synonyms
- Tirucallia arbuscula (Balf.f.) P.V.Heath

= Euphorbia arbuscula =

Species of plant

Euphorbia arbuscula is a species of plant in the spurge family (Euphorbiaceae). It is endemic to the archipelago of Socotra in Yemen. Its natural habitats are subtropical or tropical dry forests and subtropical or tropical dry shrubland.

Scottish botanist Isaac Bayley Balfour described this species in 1884 from material collected from the Yemeni island of Socotra, where he recorded it as common. The species name is derived from the Latin adjective arbusculus "small tree". Two subspecies are recognised. Balfour had visited Socotra in 1880 and collected many plants. Within the large genus Euphorbia it is classified in the subgenus Euphorbia section Tirucalli.

The nominate subspecies arbuscula has a tree-like habit, reaching 6 m (20 ft) tall. It has cylindrical greyish green branches. Subspecies montana is smaller, reaching 2 m (7 ft) in height. There are leaves only on the newest shoots, the plants' other greener branches photosynthesise sunlight instead.

The leaflets are eaten by goats, both when the leaves are dried out and when they are green and fresh. For that reason, this species is often planted near settlements. Herders who seek to harvest food for their herd should avoid chopping off whole branches, or violently beating the branches to knock off the leaflets, in which case the plant is less likely to recover. This plant flowers during the hot, dry season and is able to survive severe drought, assuming it is not abused by herders. Its pores close during the day, to minimize transpirational water-loss, as part of its crassulacean acid metabolism (CAM).

When cut or injured, this plant exudes a caustic latex that can burn the skin of a human who is not adequately protected. The latex from this plant is useful for veterinary, medicinal, and other purposes such as for fishing.

== Bibliography and further reading ==
- Jacobsen, Hermann. Abromeitiella to Euphorbia, p. 408 (Blandford Press, 1960).
- Burgess, Neil. Terrestrial ecoregions of Africa and Madagascar: a conservation assessment, p. 413 (Island Press, 2004).
