= Dirichletia obovata =

Conservation status
- Least Concern (IUCN 3.1)

Scientific classification
- Kingdom: Plantae
- Clade: Tracheophytes
- Clade: Angiosperms
- Clade: Eudicots
- Clade: Asterids
- Order: Gentianales
- Family: Rubiaceae
- Genus: Dirichletia
- Species: D. obovata

Binomial name
- Dirichletia obovata Balf.f. (1882)

Synonyms
- Carphalea obovata (Balf.f.) Verdc. (1973 publ. 1974); Dirichletia lanceolata Balf.f. (1882); Dirichletia obovata var. albescens Balf.f. (1884); Dirichletia venulosa Balf.f. (1882)

Species of plant

Dirichletia obovata, synonym Carphalea obovata, is a species of plant in the family Rubiaceae. It is a shrub endemic to Socotra. It has small pink or lilac flowers, and has a distinctive asymmetric wing-like calyx which gradually expands to hide the developing fruit. It is locally common in montane woodland and along wadis at lower elevations, from 100–1,100 metres elevation.
