= Haya obovata =

Conservation status
- Least Concern (IUCN 3.1)

Scientific classification
- Kingdom: Plantae
- Clade: Tracheophytes
- Clade: Angiosperms
- Clade: Eudicots
- Order: Caryophyllales
- Family: Caryophyllaceae
- Genus: Haya; Balf.f.
- Species: H. obovata

Binomial name
- Haya obovata Balf.f.

Species of plant

Haya is a monotypic genus of flowering plants in the family Caryophyllaceae. It contains the single species Haya obovata, which is endemic to Yemen's Socotra island. Haya obovata grows in subtropical or tropical dry shrubland and rocky areas.
