= Euphorbia kuriensis =

Conservation status
- Vulnerable (IUCN 3.1)

Scientific classification
- Kingdom: Plantae
- Clade: Tracheophytes
- Clade: Angiosperms
- Clade: Eudicots
- Clade: Rosids
- Order: Malpighiales
- Family: Euphorbiaceae
- Genus: Euphorbia
- Species: E. kuriensis

Binomial name
- Euphorbia kuriensis Vierh.

Species of flowering plant

Euphorbia kuriensis is a species of plant in the family Euphorbiaceae. It is endemic to Abd al Kuri in the Socotra Archipelago of Yemen. Its natural habitat is subtropical or tropical dry shrubland.
