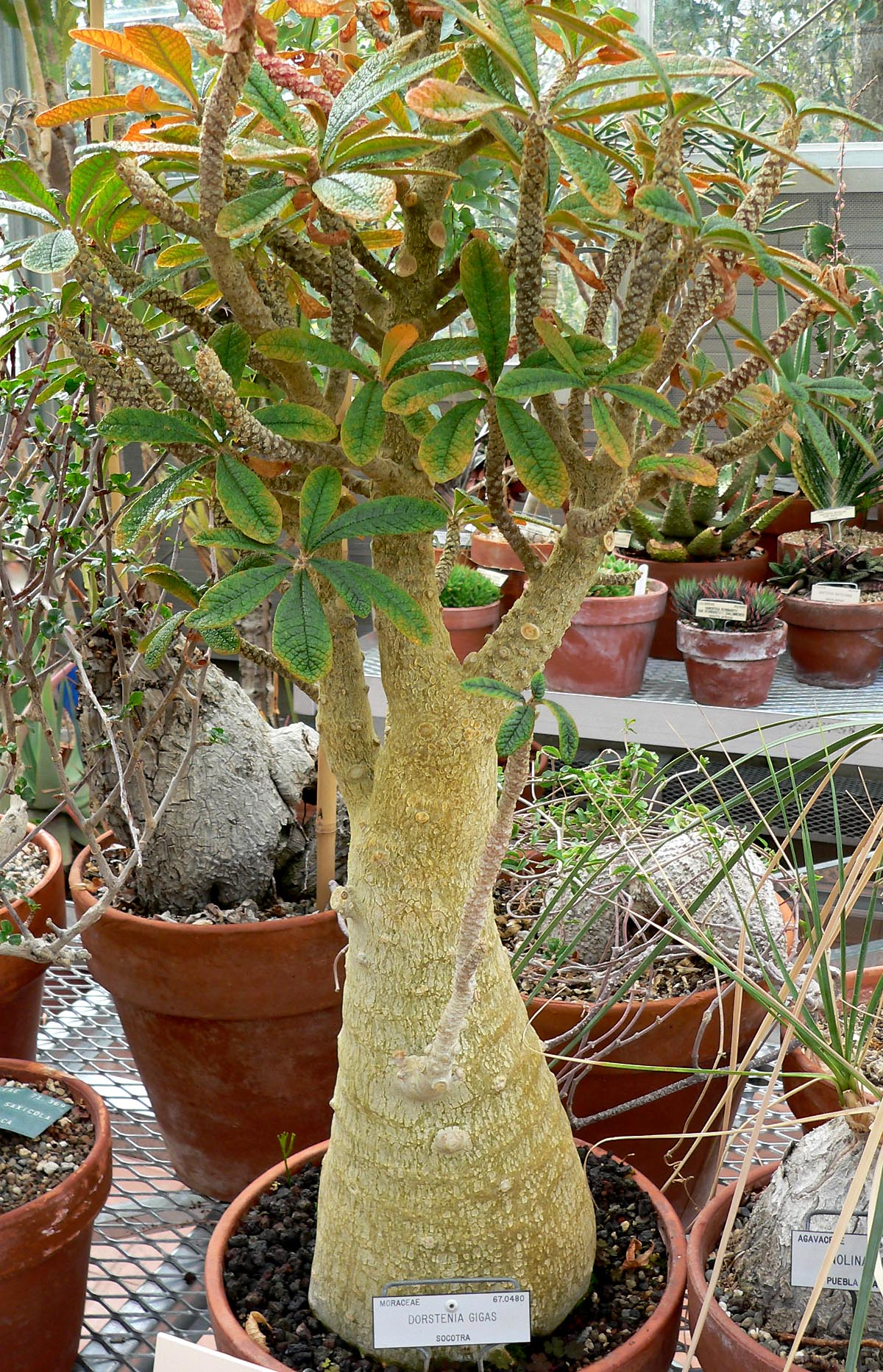
- D. gigas cultivated in California

Conservation status
- Near Threatened (IUCN 3.1)

Scientific classification
- Kingdom: Plantae
- Clade: Tracheophytes
- Clade: Angiosperms
- Clade: Eudicots
- Clade: Rosids
- Order: Rosales
- Family: Moraceae
- Genus: Dorstenia
- Species: D. gigas

Binomial name
- Dorstenia gigas Schweinf. ex Balf.f.

= Dorstenia gigas =

Species of plant

Dorstenia gigas is a species of flowering plant in the Moraceae family. It is a succulent native to the Socotra Islands off the Horn of Africa.
