= Searsia thyrsiflora =

Conservation status
- Least Concern (IUCN 3.1)

Scientific classification
- Kingdom: Plantae
- Clade: Tracheophytes
- Clade: Angiosperms
- Clade: Eudicots
- Clade: Rosids
- Order: Sapindales
- Family: Anacardiaceae
- Genus: Searsia
- Species: S. thyrsiflora

Binomial name
- Searsia thyrsiflora (Balf.f.) Moffett

Synonyms
- Rhus thyrsiflora Balf.f.

Species of plant

Searsia thyrsiflora is a species of plant in the family Anacardiaceae. It is a shrub or tree endemic to the island of Socotra in Yemen. Its natural habitat is subtropical or tropical dry forests.
