= Socotrella =

Conservation status
- Vulnerable (IUCN 3.1)

Scientific classification
- Kingdom: Plantae
- Clade: Tracheophytes
- Clade: Angiosperms
- Clade: Eudicots
- Clade: Asterids
- Order: Gentianales
- Family: Apocynaceae
- Subfamily: Asclepiadoideae
- Tribe: Ceropegieae
- Genus: Socotrella; Bruyns & A.G.Mill.
- Species: S. dolichocnema

Binomial name
- Socotrella dolichocnema Bruyns

Species of plant

Socotrella is a monotypic genus of plant in family Apocynaceae. It contains the single species Socotrella dolichocnema, which is endemic to Socotra.
