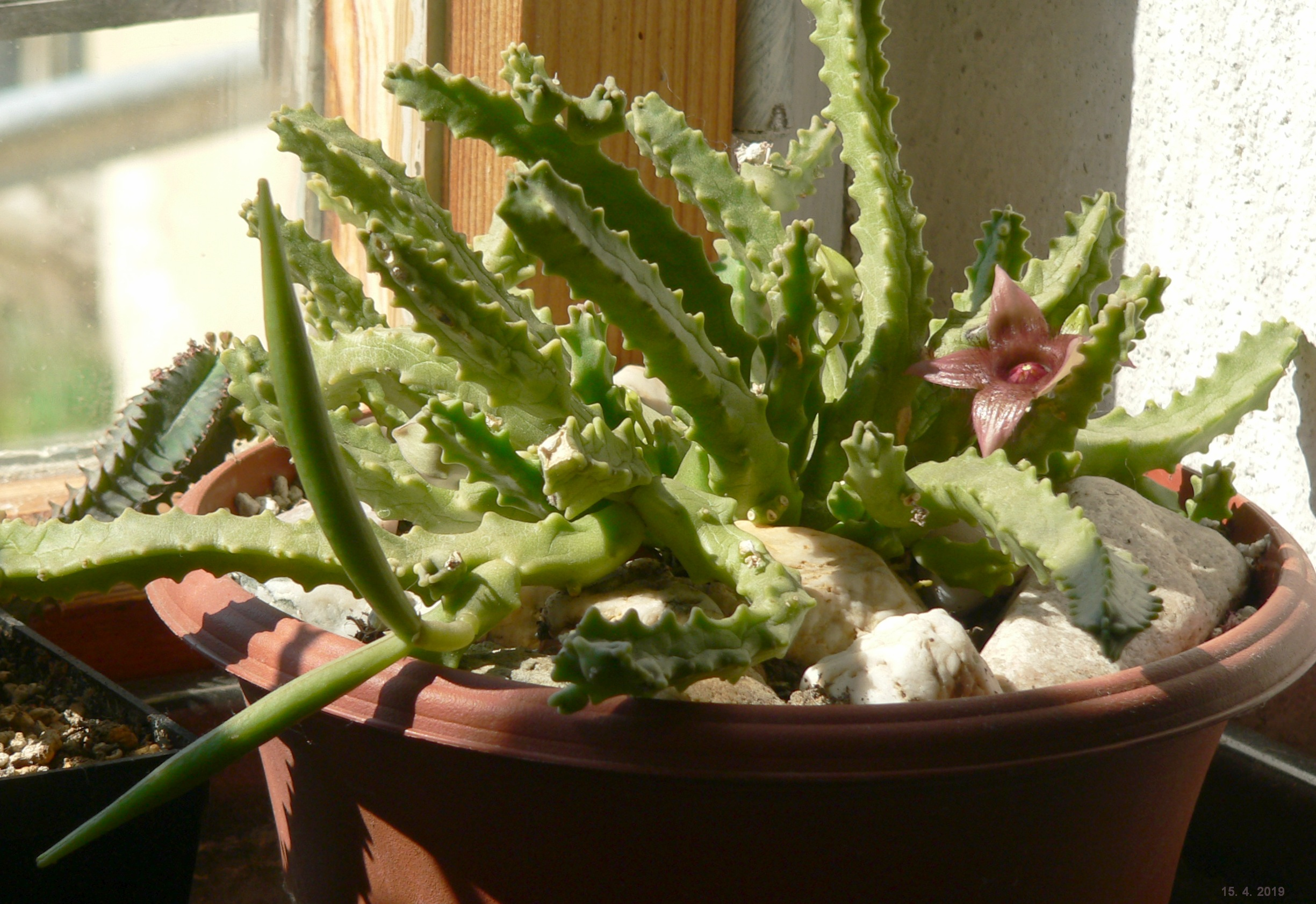

Scientific classification
- Kingdom: Plantae
- Clade: Tracheophytes
- Clade: Angiosperms
- Clade: Eudicots
- Clade: Asterids
- Order: Gentianales
- Family: Apocynaceae
- Subfamily: Asclepiadoideae
- Tribe: Ceropegieae
- Genus: Duvaliandra; M.G.Gilbert
- Species: D. dioscoridis

Binomial name
- Duvaliandra dioscoridis (Lavranos) M.G. Gilbert

Synonyms
- Caralluma dioscoridis Lavranos

= Duvaliandra =

Genus of flowering plants

Duvaliandra is a species of plants in the Apocynaceae first described as a genus in 1980. It contains only one known species, Duvaliandra dioscoridis, native to the Socotra Islands in the Indian Ocean.
