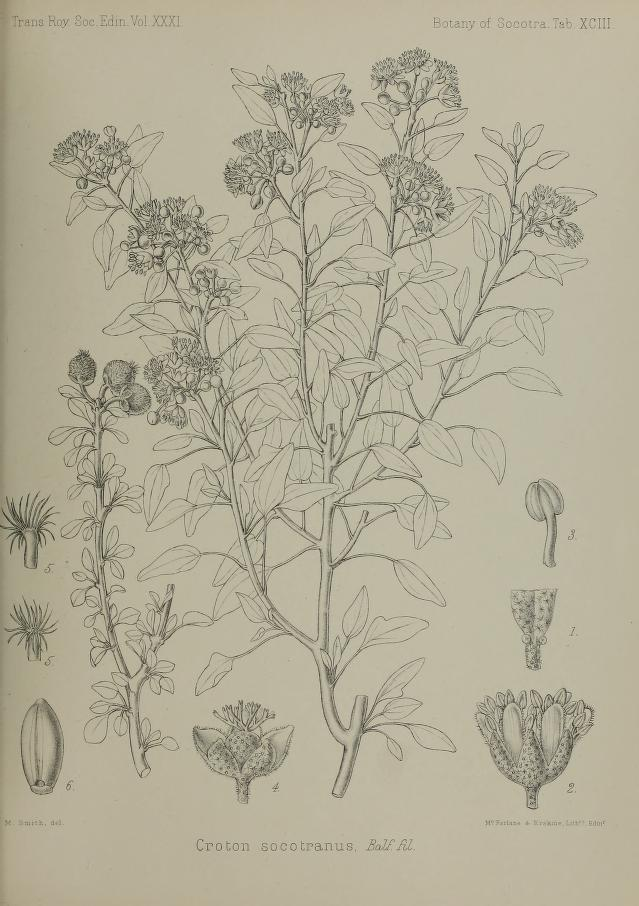
- Botanical illustration

Conservation status
- Least Concern (IUCN 3.1)

Scientific classification
- Kingdom: Plantae
- Clade: Tracheophytes
- Clade: Angiosperms
- Clade: Eudicots
- Clade: Rosids
- Order: Malpighiales
- Family: Euphorbiaceae
- Genus: Croton
- Species: C. socotranus

Binomial name
- Croton socotranus Balf.f.

Synonyms
- Croton pachyclados Radcl.-Sm.

= Croton socotranus =

Species of plant

Croton socotranus is a species of flowering plant in the family Euphorbiaceae, native to Socotra. A shrub, it is dominant in the meterhel croton shrubland, co-dominant in the shirmihin d'efer mixed deciduous shrubland, and is found in many other shrubland biotopes.

== Subtaxa ==
The following subtaxa are accepted:

- Croton socotranus var. pachyclados (Radcl.-Sm.) Radcl.-Sm. – Mt. Hamaderoh
- Croton socotranus var. socotranus – entire range
