= Isaac Bayley Balfour =

Scottish botanist (1853–1922)

Sir Isaac Bayley Balfour KBE FRS FRSE
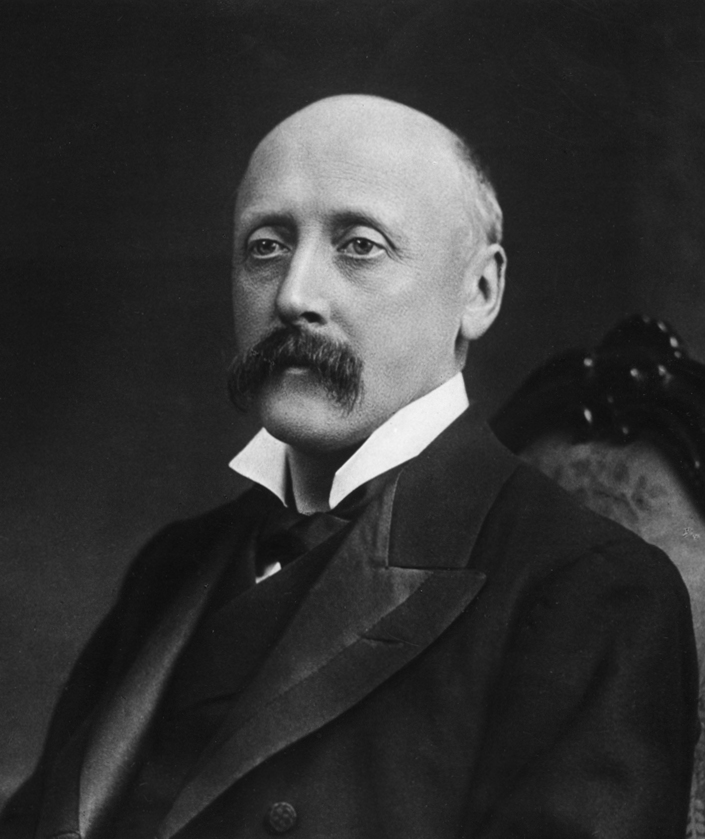
- Born: 31 March 1853; 27 Inverleith Row, Edinburgh
- Died: 30 November 1922 (aged 69); Court Hill, Haslemere, Surrey
- Education: University of Edinburgh (BSc); University of Glasgow (LLD)
- Occupation: botanist
- Known for: Major reform of the Royal Botanic Garden Edinburgh including establishing a botanical institute and redeveloping the facilities and layout of the Garden. Founding the botanical journal ‘Annals of Botany’ and championing the use of surgical dressings of dried sphagnum moss in the First World War.
- Spouse: Agnes Boyd Balloch
- Parents: John Hutton Balfour; Marion Spottiswood Bayley
- Awards: Linnean Medal of the Linnean Society (1919)
- Scientific career
- Author abbrev. (botany): Balf.f.

Sir Isaac Bayley Balfour, KBE, FRS, FRSE (31 March 1853 – 30 November 1922) was a Scottish botanist. He was Regius Professor of Botany at the University of Glasgow from 1879 to 1885, Sherardian Professor of Botany at the University of Oxford from 1884 to 1888, and Professor of Botany at the University of Edinburgh from 1888 to 1922.

== Early life ==
He was the son of John Hutton Balfour, also a botanist, and Marion Spottiswood Bayley, and was born at home, 27 Inverleith Row, Edinburgh. His mother was granddaughter of George Husband Baird.

He was the cousin of Sir James Crichton-Browne.

== Biography ==
Balfour was educated at the Edinburgh Academy from 1864 to 1870. At this early stage his interests and abilities were in the biological sciences, which were taught to him by his father. Due to his father's post as Professor of Botany at Edinburgh, the young Balfour was able to visit the Edinburgh Botanical Gardens, not open to the public at the time.

Balfour studied at the University of Edinburgh, from which he graduated in 1873 with a BSc (1st Class) in Natural Science. In 1874 he participated in an astronomical expedition of 1874 to Rodrigues. Though the stated aim of the mission was to observe Venus, Balfour used the opportunity to investigate the local flora, and on his return, the fieldwork he had carried out permitted him to gain his doctorate in botany in 1875. Concurrent medical studies, including working as a wound dresser at Edinburgh Royal Infirmary under Joseph Lister the famous antisepsis pioneer, led him to graduate as a medical doctor with honours in 1877.

Between 1877 and 1879 Balfour also spent time at the universities in Würzburg and Strasbourg with the influential plant physiologist Julius von Sachs and plant pathologist Heinrich Anton de Bary. He later went on to translate some of their textbooks into English for The Clarendon Press (now Oxford University Press).

In 1879, his father resigned the chair at Edinburgh, Glasgow professor Alexander Dickson (1836–1887) was appointed in his place, and the younger Balfour was promoted to the chair of Regius Professor of Botany, Glasgow in Glasgow from 1879 to 1885. He also went on to lead an expedition to Socotra in 1880. During his 1880 expedition to the Island of Socotra, Bayley Balfour would make a huge breakthrough into discovering the origins of the color dragon's blood. This occurred when he discovered the plant “Dracaena cinnabari on Socotra island.” After collecting some samples he sent them to be analysed by “Glasgow's Professor of Chemistry James Dobbie and G Henderson.”This was very important as it marked the first scientific investigation into the origins of the color known as Dragons Blood. “Of the 15 Dracaena resin samples that are housed within the EBC some of them have certain geographic origins, most are of D. cinnabari from this collection of samples are from Socotra Balfour himself.” This was important as it showed that certain colors can only be found in certain geographic regions.

In 1884, he was appointed Sherardian Professor of Botany at the University of Oxford. and in the same year married Agnes Boyd Balloch. It was about this time, inspired by the kind of experimental botany he experienced at Würzburg and Strasbourg, Balfour founded an English language journal for experimental and observational botany entitled 'Annals of Botany' in collaboration with other young botanists most notably Sydney Howard Vines. Appearing in 1887 and published by the Clarendon Press, Annals of Botany remains one of the world’s leading plant science journals

It was, however, after his return to Edinburgh to take up his father's old chair as Professor of Botany from 1888 to 1922 that Balfour left his lasting mark on Scottish botany, following his appointment as 9th Regius Keeper of the Royal Botanic Garden Edinburgh. His father had greatly enlarged the botanical gardens during his tenure, but Balfour completely transformed them with support from Sir William Turner Thiselton Dyer, Director of the Royal Botanic Gardens Kew and editorial colleague at Annals of Botany. Balfour put the Edinburgh Garden’s finances on a safer footing by transferring them to the Crown, engaging in a major structural reforms of the Garden, establishing a botanical institute, and redeveloping the layout of the gardens to create a proper arboretum, new laboratories and improved scientific facilities.

Balfour was awarded KBE in the 1920 civilian war honours list. The knighthood was not for services to botany per se but for 'services in connection with the war' - a recognition of his work supporting the 1914-18 British war effort. This will have included keeping the Royal Botanic Garden Edinburgh going despite the severe shortage of manpower and materials and being involved in the Timber Supply Department setup to maintain supplies of timber during the hostilities and re-establish Britain’s forests after the war. Of greater significance was Balfour’s success, shared with his friend Charles Walker Cathcart, in persuading the War Office to adopt sphagnum moss bandaging in military hospitals and in identifying the best species to use and where to find them. The outcome was millions of wound dressings made from dried and sterilised Sphagnum papillosum and S. palustre. These undoubtedly saved many lives and towards the end of the war over one million such dressings a month were being used by British hospitals. Their effectiveness relied on the acidic antiseptic properties of dried sphagnum (first recognised in Germany in the late 19th Century) and its capacious ability to absorb up to twenty times its own volume of blood and other bodily liquids.

Balfour died at Court Hill, Haslemere in Surrey.

== Family ==
In 1884 he married Agnes Boyd Balloch. Their daughter Isabel Marion Agnes (Senga) Bayley Balfour, married the diplomat Francis Aglen and was mother to Anthony John Aglen.. His only son, also named Isaac Bayley, or ‘Bay’, was killed in 1915 while serving in the First World War at Gallipoli.

== Specific interests ==
Balfour's interest in Sino-Himalayan plants also put him in contact with botanist and plant collector Reginald Farrer. Farrer provided valuable information to Balfour and the Royal Botanic Garden Edinburgh by sending him his plant illustrations together with the field notes, botanical specimens and seeds he had collected.

== Honours, qualifications and appointments ==
- 1873: Awarded Bachelor of Science degree (BSc) with first class honours, University of Edinburgh
- 1873–1878: Appointed Lecturer in Botany, Royal Veterinary College, Edinburgh
- 1875: Awarded Doctor of Science degree (DSc), University of Edinburgh
- 1877: Awarded Bachelor of Medicine, Bachelor of Surgery degree (MB, ChB), University of Edinburgh
- 1877: Elected Fellow of the Royal Society of Edinburgh
- 1879: Appointed Professor of Botany, University of Glasgow
- 1880–1882, 1904–1906: President of the Botanical Society of Edinburgh
- 1884: Awarded Master of Arts degree (MA), University of Oxford
- 1884: Elected Fellow of the Royal Society
- 1884: Appointed Professor of Botany, University of Oxford
- 1888: Appointed Professor of Botany, University of Edinburgh
- 1897: Awarded Victoria Medal of Honour, Royal Horticultural Society
- 1901: Awarded Doctor of Laws degree (LLD), University of Glasgow
- 1919: Awarded Linnean Medal of the Linnean Society
- 1920: Awarded Knight Commander of the Order of the British Empire (KBE)
- 1921: Awarded Honorary Doctor of Laws degree (LLD), University of Edinburgh

== Commemoration ==
The standard author abbreviation Balf.f. is used to indicate this person as the author when citing a botanical name.

The Benmore Estate was gifted to the nation by Harry George Younger of the Younger's family, and in 1928 he had the Bayley Balfour Memorial Hut, dedicated to Sir Isaac, placed in Puck's Glen. It was designed by Sir Robert Lorimer, with wooden panels using every variety of timber grown at Benmore. It also commemorated the contribution of James Duncan, a previous owner of the estate. The woodland was taken over by the Forestry Commission, which dedicated the area around the glen to the memory of Sir Isaac, while the central part of the estate was opened in 1929 as the Younger Botanic Garden, the first outstation of the Royal Botanic Garden Edinburgh. In 1968 the Bayley Balfour Memorial Hut was restored, and moved to a new site in the walled garden of Benmore House.

Balfour is commemorated in the scientific name of a species of Socotran lizard, Mesalina balfouri. and of the Socotran butterfly Charaxes balfourii.

== Works ==
- Balfour was a contributor to: Britannica Booklet No. 10: Botany, the Science: A Selection of Articles from the New 14th Edition of the Encyclopaedia Britannica (1929).
