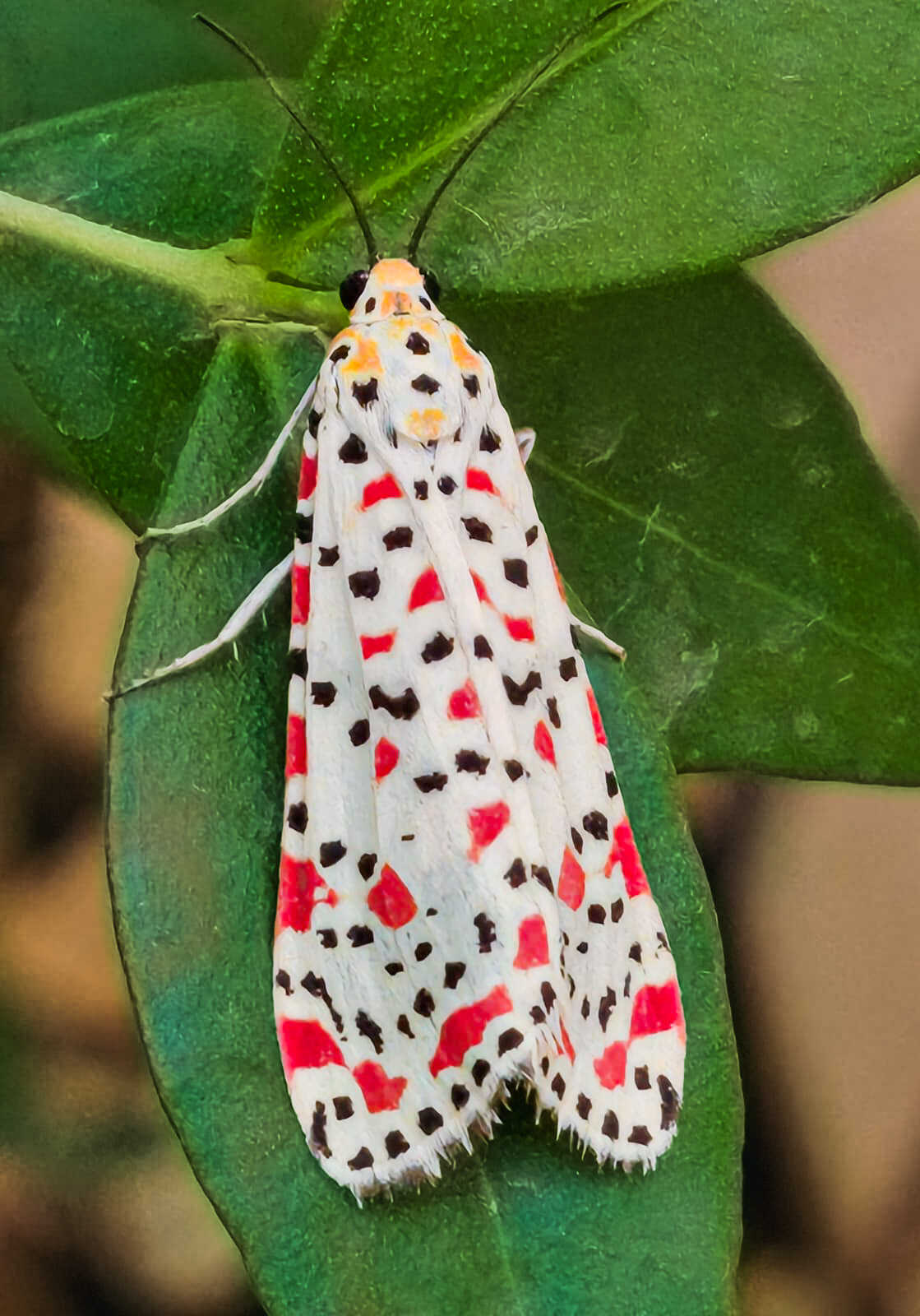
- Utetheisa pulchella (crimson-speckled moth) photographed in Iraq, showing its distinctive white wings with black spots and red markings.

Scientific classification
- Kingdom: Animalia
- Phylum: Arthropoda
- Clade: Pancrustacea
- Class: Insecta
- Order: Lepidoptera
- Superfamily: Noctuoidea
- Family: Erebidae
- Subfamily: Arctiinae
- Genus: Utetheisa
- Species: U. pulchella

Binomial name
- Utetheisa pulchella (Linnaeus, 1758)

Synonyms
- List: Tinea pulchella Linnaeus, 1758; Deiopeia pulchra; Utetheisa callima dilutior Rothschild, 1910; Utetheisa kallima C. Swinhoe, 1907; Utetheisa pulchella completa Weymer, 1908; Lithosia amabilis Trost, 1801; Deiopeia pulchella var. candida Butler, 1877; Noctua pulchra Denis & Schiffermüller, 1775; Utetheisa thytea Rothschild, 1914; Deiopeia thyter Butler, 1877; Utetheisa shyama Bhattacherjee & Gupta, 1969; Utetheisa shiba Bhattacherjee & Gupta, 1969; Utetheisa menoni Bhattacherjee & Gupta, 1969

= Utetheisa pulchella =

Crimson-speckled flunkey

Species of moth

== Subspecies ==
Subspecies include:

- Utetheisa pulchella antennata (C. Swinhoe, 1893) (Nicobars)
- Utetheisa pulchella completa Weymer, 1908
- Utetheisa pulchella dilutior Rothschild, 1910 (Angola, Congo)
- Utetheisa pulchella kallima C. Swinhoe, 1907 (Angola)
- Utetheisa pulchella pulchella (Linnaeus, 1758)
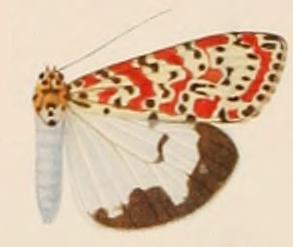
Utetheisa pulchella diluitor

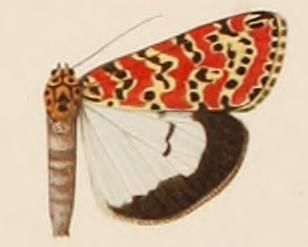
Utetheisa pulchella kallima

== Distribution and habitat ==
This common widespread species can be found in most of Europe (as a migrant), in the entire Afrotropical realm, North Africa, in the Near East and Central Asia, in the western Indomalayan realm (not known east of Myanmar.) In the United Kingdom it is only a sporadic migrant. These moths inhabit dry open places, meadows, shrublands, grasslands and parks.

== Description ==
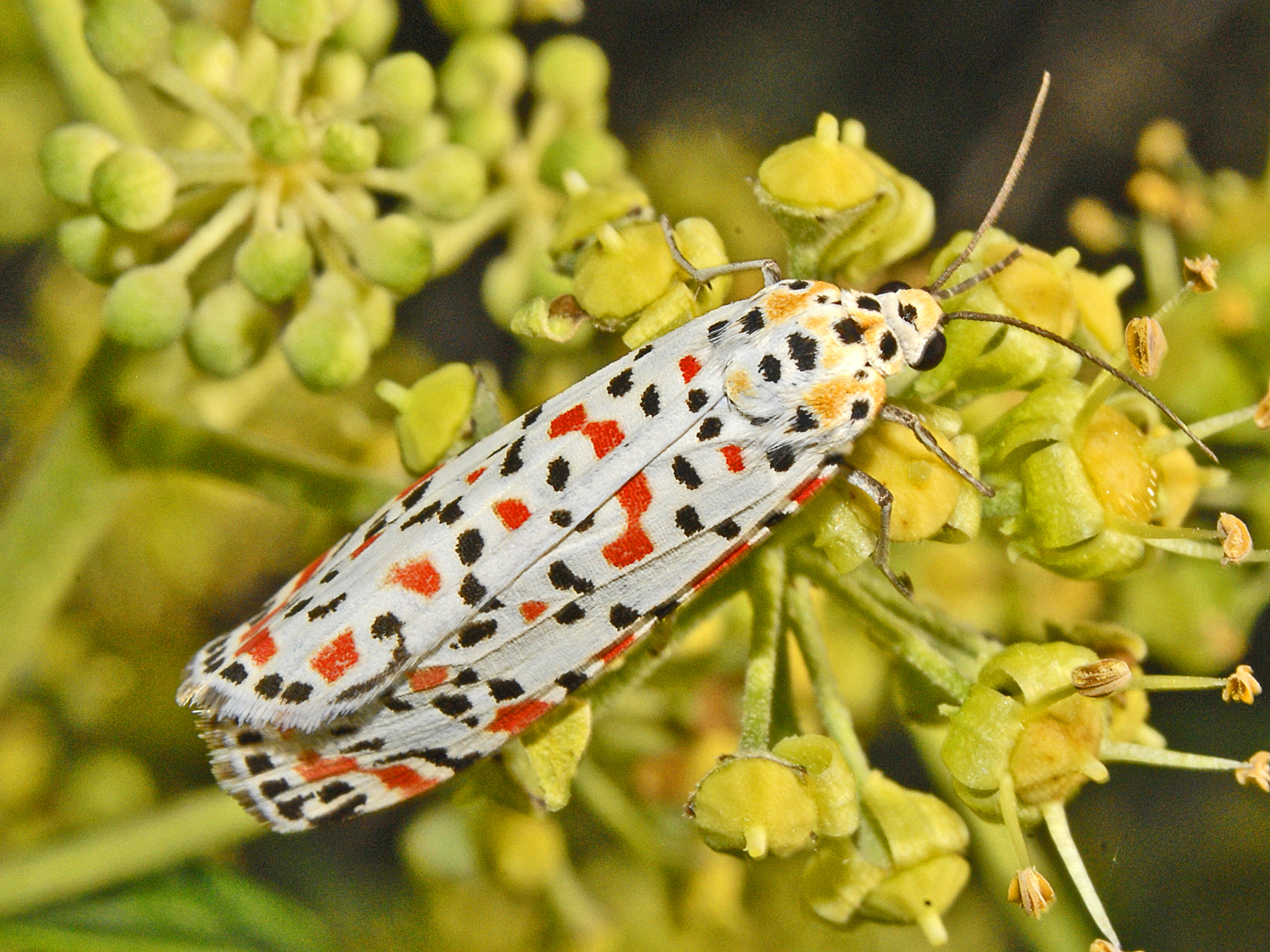
Dorsal view

The wingspan of Utetheisa pulchella can reach 29–42 mm. The front wings are narrow, white or cream coloured with a variable pattern of numerous small black spots located between the larger-sized bright red spots. Sometimes the red spots are merged to transversal bands. The hindwings are wide, white, with an irregular black border along the outer edge and two black markings in the middle of the cell. The head and thorax range from cream colour to buff yellow, with the same pattern as the wings. The antennae are long and monofiliform. The abdomen is smooth, with a white background.

Caterpillars are warty, dark brown or greyish, with tufts of greyish hairs, an orange crossline on each segment, a wide whitish line along the back and two other lateral white lines.

== Biology ==
This species in southern Europe overwinters as a caterpillar. Pupation occurs on the ground near the host plants, usually on fallen leaves and dead vegetation, or pieces of bark and old wood. During mild winters in temperate and typically Mediterranean climates this species hibernates as pupae. Adults of this multivoltine species usually are present from March to early November in three generations a year, but in the tropics, they develop continuously. They fly both day and night and come to light. The polyphagous larvae feed on a range of herbaceous plants, mainly on forget-me-not (Myosotis), Echium, Borago officinalis, Solanum, Plantago lanceolata and Anchusa species. In the Afrotropical realm they mainly feed on Trichodesma zeylanicum, Lithospermum, Heliotropium, Trichodesma and Gossypium species.

Due to their food, the caterpillars accumulate a large amount of alkaloids, consequently also the moths are toxic and unpalatable to birds. The characteristic colouration of its wings serve as a sign of warning to their predators (aposematism).

== Gallery ==
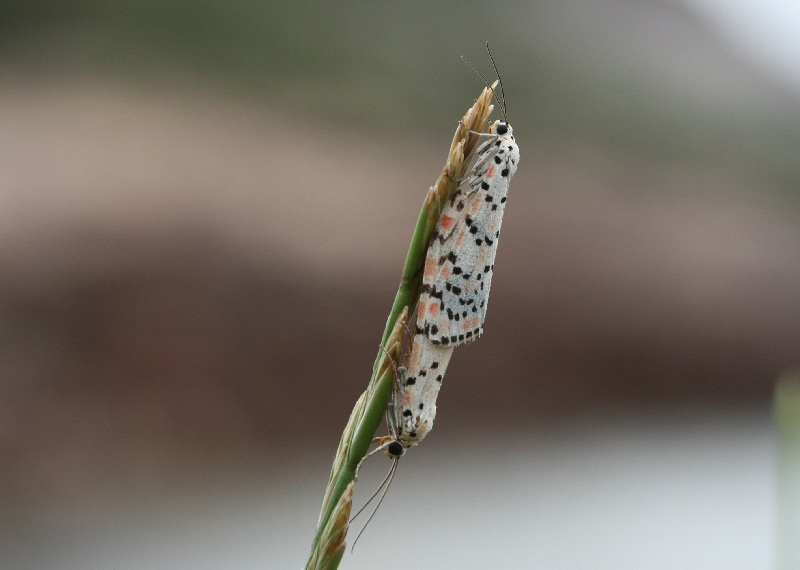
Mating pairs

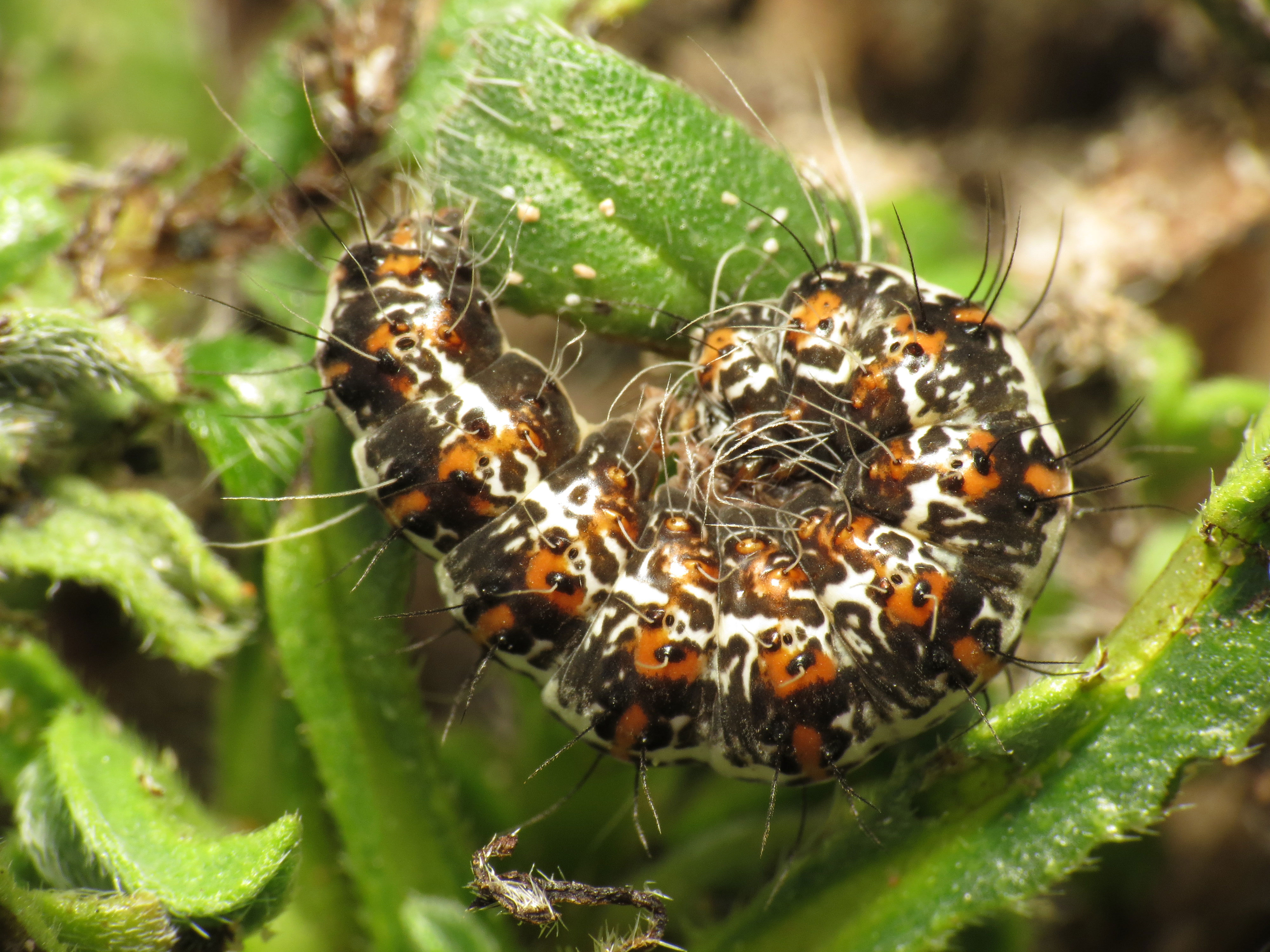
Caterpillar

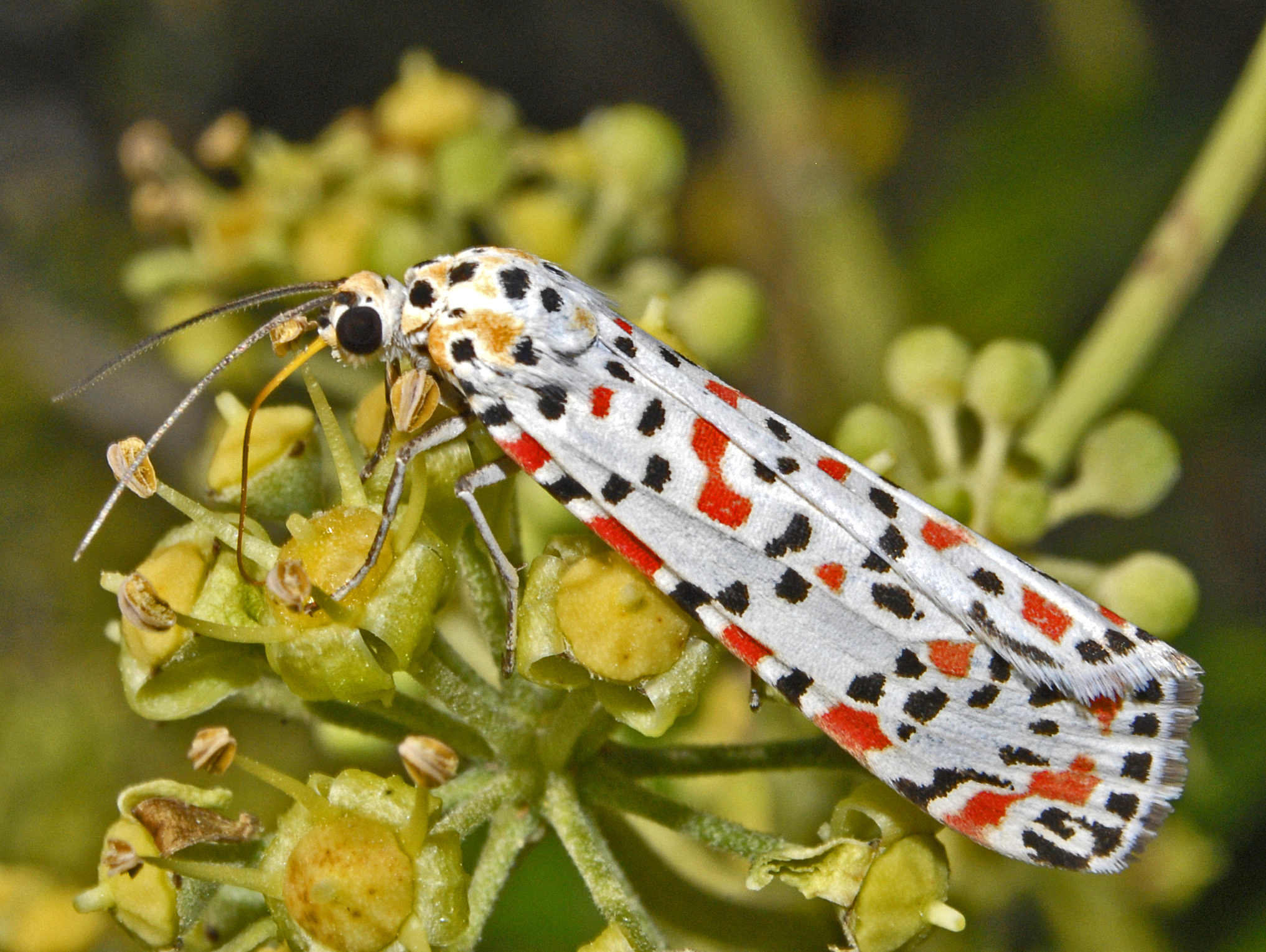
Feeding on Hedera flowers

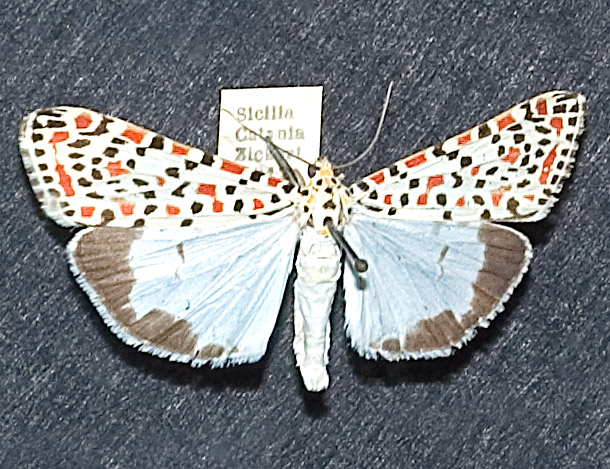
Mounted specimen

== Bibliography ==
- Porter, Jim. The Colour Identification Guide to Caterpillars of the British Isles.
- Philips, Roger & Carter, David. Kosmos Atlas Schmetterlingsführer, Europäische Tag und Nachtfalter. Franckh-Kosmos Verlag, Stuttgart 1991, ISBN 3-440-06306-2.
- Scoble, Malcolm J. (1995, London). The Lepidoptera: Form, Function and Diversity. Oxford University Press/Natural History Museum of London.
- Waring, Townsend and Lewington. Field Guide to the Moths of Great Britain and Ireland
