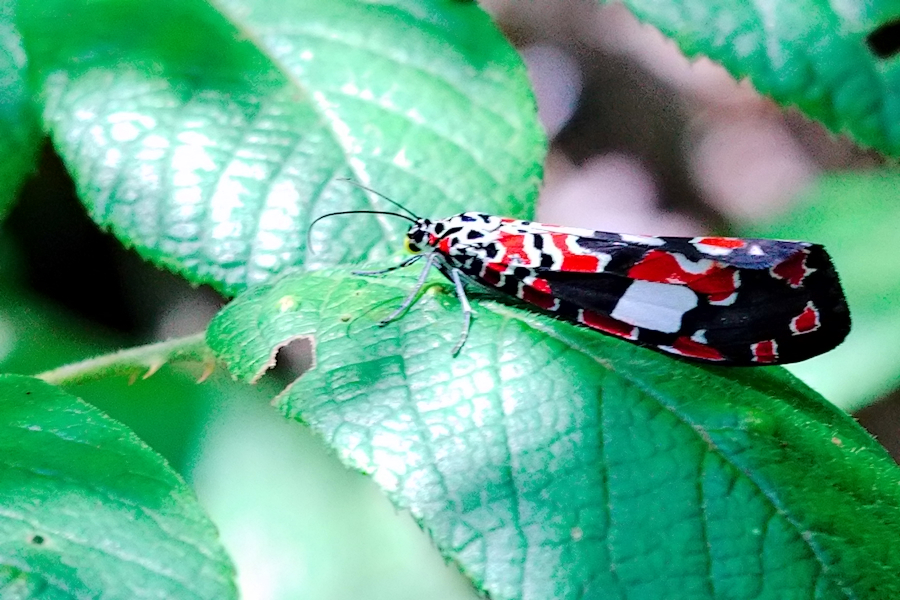
- In Amber Mountain National Park, Madagascar

Scientific classification
- Domain: Eukaryota
- Kingdom: Animalia
- Phylum: Arthropoda
- Class: Insecta
- Order: Lepidoptera
- Superfamily: Noctuoidea
- Family: Erebidae
- Subfamily: Arctiinae
- Genus: Utetheisa
- Species: U. elata

Binomial name
- Utetheisa elata (Fabricius, 1798)

Synonyms
- Bombyx elata Fabricius, 1798; Deilemera fatua Heyn, 1906; Utetheisa fatua ab. devittata Strand, 1909; Utetheisa fatua ab. mediomaculata Strand, 1909; Euchelia formosa Boisduval, 1833; Utetheisa venusta Hübner, 1831

= Utetheisa elata =

Species of moth

Utetheisa elata is a moth in the family Erebidae. It was described by Johan Christian Fabricius in 1798. It is found in Angola, South Africa and Tanzania, as well as on the Comoros, Réunion, Madagascar, Mauritius and the Seychelles.

The larvae have been recorded feeding on Tournefortia argentea, Heliotropium amplexicaule, Trichodesma zeylanicum, Heliotropium indicum, Tournefortia sarmentosa, Crotalaria juncea and Crotalaria striata.

== Subspecies ==
- Utetheisa elata elata
- Utetheisa elata fatua (Heyn, 1906)
- Utetheisa elata fatela Jordan, 1939
