= Watubela =

Watubela may be,

- Watubela archipelago
- Watubela language
- Utetheisa watubela (sp. moth)
