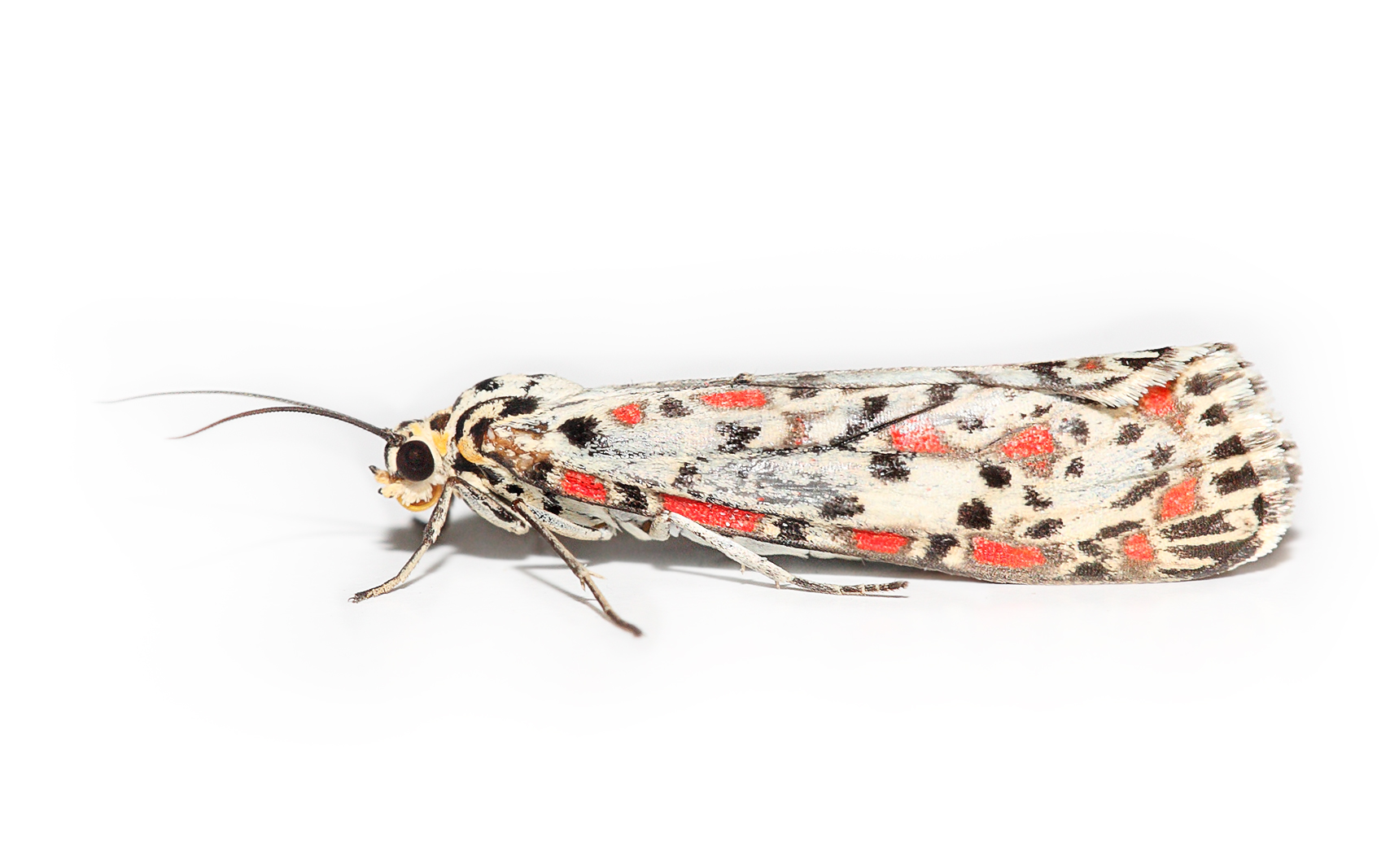

Scientific classification
- Kingdom: Animalia
- Phylum: Arthropoda
- Class: Insecta
- Order: Lepidoptera
- Superfamily: Noctuoidea
- Family: Erebidae
- Subfamily: Arctiinae
- Genus: Utetheisa
- Species: U. pulchelloides

Binomial name
- Utetheisa pulchelloides Hampson, 1907

Synonyms
- Utetheisa idae Gates Clarke, 1940; Utetheisa dorsifumata Prout, 1920

= Utetheisa pulchelloides =

Heliotrope moth

Species of moth

Utetheisa pulchelloides, the heliotrope moth, is a moth of the family Erebidae. It is found in the Indo-Australian region including Borneo, Hong Kong, New Zealand, Papua, Seychelles, most of Australia, Tenerife, La Línea de la Concepción [Cádiz] and Greece. The species was first described by George Hampson in 1907.

Adults undertake extensive and frequent migratory flights and can reach the most remote oceanic islands, such as Henderson Island and Ducie Island.

== Description ==
Hindwing of male with no fold or glandular tuft on inner margin. Head and thorax yellowish. Collar and tegula each with two black spots. Each thoracic segment with one each black spot. Third joint of palpi black and abdomen whitish. Forewing white with five interrupted scarlet bands with series of black spots between them. A marginal series of black spots present. Hindwings are semi-diaphanous white, but some specimen with black on the discocellulars. A very irregular black sub-marginal band, broad at apical area and between veins 1b and 3. Larva dark grey with a dorsal white band and sub-dorsal series of red spots. Head yellow. It pupates in a loose cocoon that spun in the leaf litter on the ground below the food plant.

== Ecology ==
The larvae feed on Argusia argentea, Echium plantagineum, Heliotropium arborescens and Myosotis arvensis.

== Subspecies ==
- Utetheisa pulchelloides pulchelloides Hampson, 1907 (Chagos Islands, Seychelles, Amirantes and Cargados Carajos Islands)
- Utetheisa pulchelloides aphanis Jordan, 1939 (islands south-east of New Guinea)
- Utetheisa pulchelloides darwini Jordan, 1939 (Cocos (Keeling) Islands)
- Utetheisa pulchelloides marshallorum Rothschild, 1910 (Marshall Islands, Fiji, Samoa, Swain's Island, Tonga, Tokelau Islands, Phoenix Islands, Tuvalu, Gilbert Islands, Wake Island, Cook Islands, Line Islands, Tuamotu Archipelago, Henderson Island)
- Utetheisa pulchelloides papuana Jordan, 1939 (New Guinea)
- Utetheisa pulchelloides umata Jordan, 1939 (Guam)
- Utetheisa pulchelloides vaga Jordan, 1939 (China: Guangdong, Guanxi, Yunnan; Taiwan; Madagascar; islands of the Indian Ocean; Sri-Lanka; south-east Asia; Moluccas; Australia; New Zealand)

Utetheisa salomonis (including the former Utetheisa pectinata ruberrima) may also belong into this species.

== Gallery ==
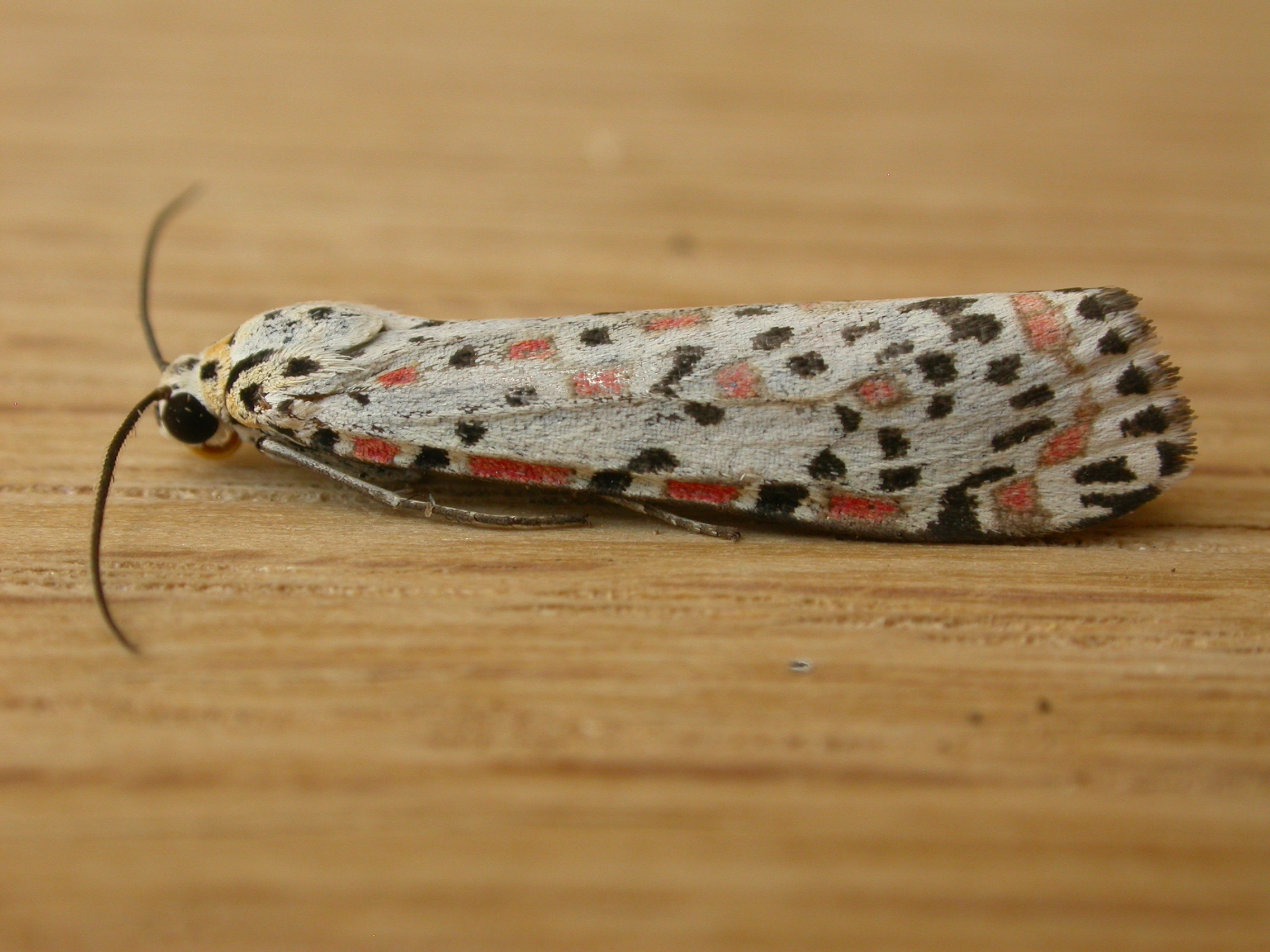

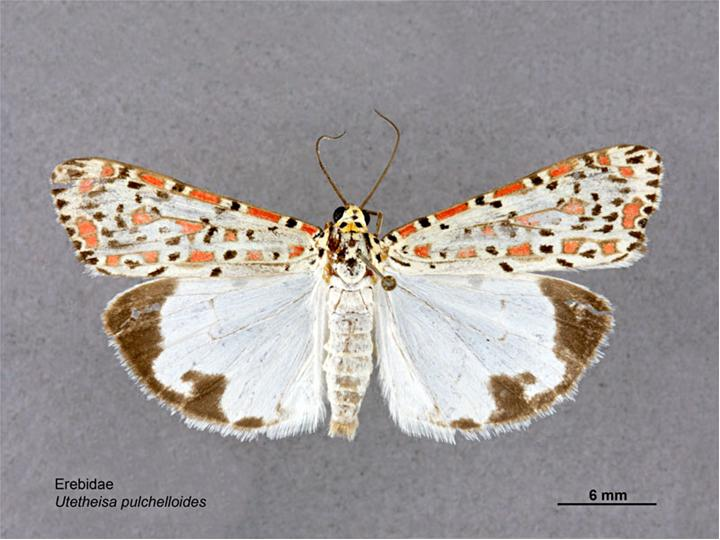
Dorsal view

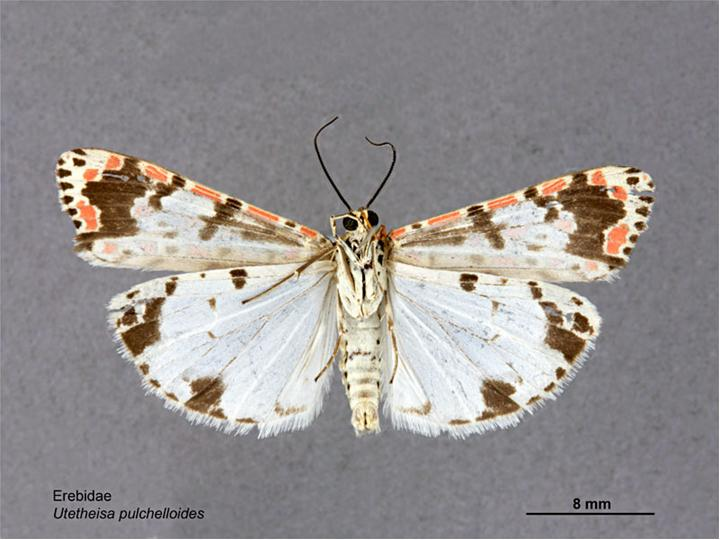
Ventral view

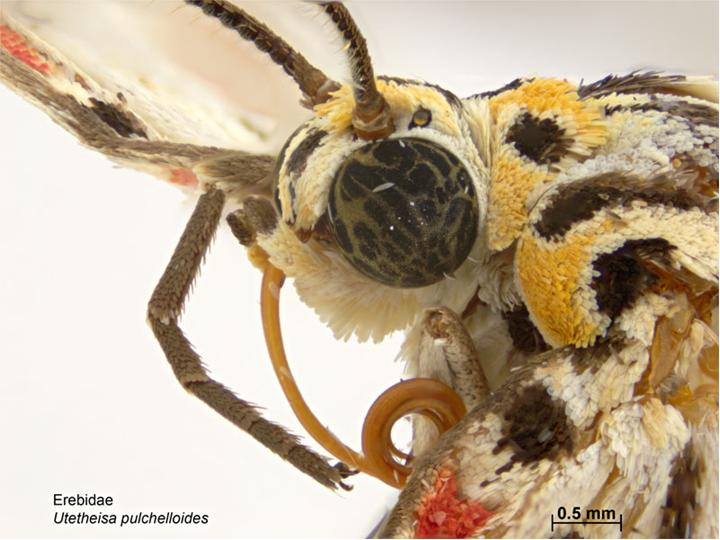
Head

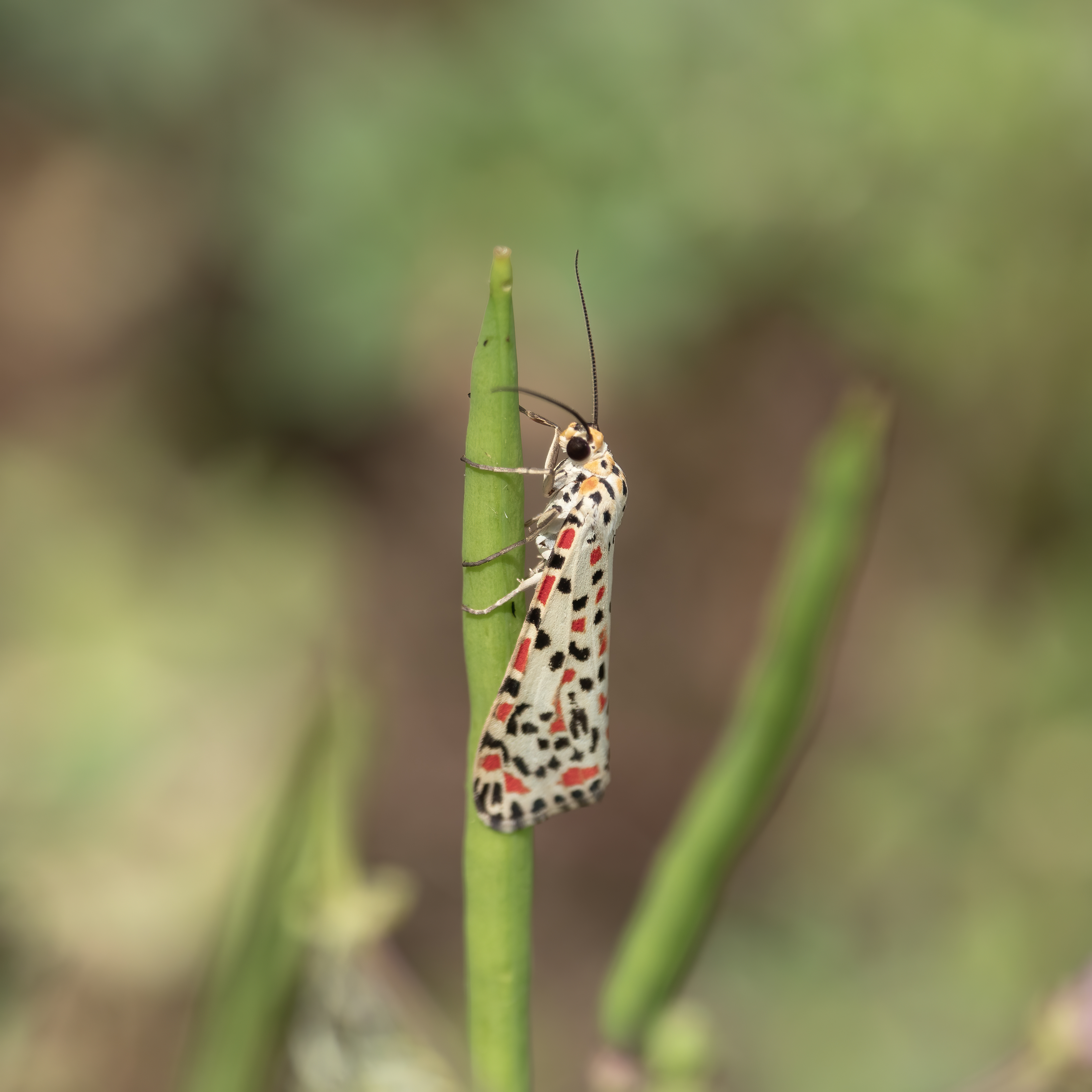
