= Utetheisa maddisoni =

Scientific classification
- Domain: Eukaryota
- Kingdom: Animalia
- Phylum: Arthropoda
- Class: Insecta
- Order: Lepidoptera
- Superfamily: Noctuoidea
- Family: Erebidae
- Subfamily: Arctiinae
- Genus: Utetheisa
- Species: U. maddisoni

Binomial name
- Utetheisa maddisoni Robinson & Robinson, 1980

Species of moth

Utetheisa maddisoni is a moth in the family Erebidae. It was described by Robinson and Robinson in 1980. It is found on Niue.
