= Utetheisa palla =

Scientific classification
- Domain: Eukaryota
- Kingdom: Animalia
- Phylum: Arthropoda
- Class: Insecta
- Order: Lepidoptera
- Superfamily: Noctuoidea
- Family: Erebidae
- Subfamily: Arctiinae
- Genus: Utetheisa
- Species: U. palla

Binomial name
- Utetheisa palla (Röber, 1891)

Synonyms
- Nyctemera macklotti var. palla Röber, 1891

Species of moth

Utetheisa palla is a moth in the family Erebidae. It was described by Röber in 1891. It is found on Sumbawa and Flores.
