= Utetheisa bouruana =

Scientific classification
- Domain: Eukaryota
- Kingdom: Animalia
- Phylum: Arthropoda
- Class: Insecta
- Order: Lepidoptera
- Superfamily: Noctuoidea
- Family: Erebidae
- Subfamily: Arctiinae
- Genus: Utetheisa
- Species: U. bouruana

Binomial name
- Utetheisa bouruana (C. Swinhoe, 1917)

Synonyms
- Deilemera bouruana C. Swinhoe, 1917

Species of moth

Utetheisa bouruana is a moth in the family Erebidae. It was described by Charles Swinhoe in 1917. It is found on the southern Moluccas.
