= Utetheisa diva =

Scientific classification
- Domain: Eukaryota
- Kingdom: Animalia
- Phylum: Arthropoda
- Class: Insecta
- Order: Lepidoptera
- Superfamily: Noctuoidea
- Family: Erebidae
- Subfamily: Arctiinae
- Genus: Utetheisa
- Species: U. diva

Binomial name
- Utetheisa diva (Mabille, 1879)

Synonyms
- Deiopeia diva Mabille, 1879

Species of moth

Utetheisa diva is a moth in the family Erebidae. It was described by Paul Mabille in 1879. It is found on Réunion, Madagascar and the Seychelles.
