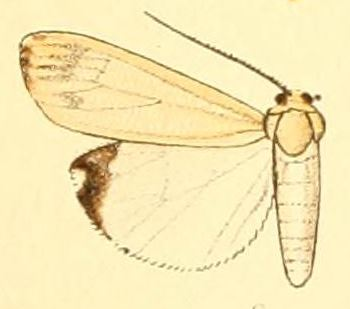

Scientific classification
- Domain: Eukaryota
- Kingdom: Animalia
- Phylum: Arthropoda
- Class: Insecta
- Order: Lepidoptera
- Superfamily: Noctuoidea
- Family: Erebidae
- Subfamily: Arctiinae
- Genus: Utetheisa
- Species: U. lactea

Binomial name
- Utetheisa lactea (Butler, 1884)

Synonyms
- Deiopeia lactea Butler, 1884; Utetheisa lactea var. aldabrae Strand, 1919; Utetheisa lactea var. rubrosignata T. B. Fletcher, 1910; Utetheisa lactea var. assumptionis Strand, 1919; Utetheisa lactea var. nigrosignata T. B. Fletcher, 1910

= Utetheisa lactea =

Species of moth

Utetheisa lactea is a moth of the family Erebidae. It was described by Arthur Gardiner Butler in 1884 and is found in the Seychelles.

== Subspecies ==
- Utetheisa lactea lactea (Butler, 1884)
- Utetheisa lactea aldabrensis T. B. Fletcher, 1910

This species has a wingspan of 37 mm.

== Biology ==
This species feeds on Tournefortia argentea (Boraginaceae).
