= Utetheisa separata =

Scientific classification
- Kingdom: Animalia
- Phylum: Arthropoda
- Class: Insecta
- Order: Lepidoptera
- Superfamily: Noctuoidea
- Family: Erebidae
- Subfamily: Arctiinae
- Genus: Utetheisa
- Species: U. separata

Binomial name
- Utetheisa separata (Walker, 1864)

Synonyms
- Nyctemera pellex f. separata Walker, 1864

Species of moth

Utetheisa separata is a moth in the family Erebidae. It was described by Francis Walker in 1864. It is found on the northern Moluccas.
