= Utetheisa aegrotum =

Scientific classification
- Domain: Eukaryota
- Kingdom: Animalia
- Phylum: Arthropoda
- Class: Insecta
- Order: Lepidoptera
- Superfamily: Noctuoidea
- Family: Erebidae
- Subfamily: Arctiinae
- Genus: Utetheisa
- Species: U. aegrotum

Binomial name
- Utetheisa aegrotum (C. Swinhoe, 1892)

Synonyms
- Leptosoma aegrotum C. Swinhoe, 1892; Nyctemera mckieana Lucas, 1898; Nyctemera avitta Seitz, 1915

Species of moth

Utetheisa aegrotum is a moth in the family Erebidae. It was described by Charles Swinhoe in 1892. It is found in Australia, where it has been recorded from Queensland and New South Wales.
