= Utetheisa aruensis =

Scientific classification
- Domain: Eukaryota
- Kingdom: Animalia
- Phylum: Arthropoda
- Class: Insecta
- Order: Lepidoptera
- Superfamily: Noctuoidea
- Family: Erebidae
- Subfamily: Arctiinae
- Genus: Utetheisa
- Species: U. aruensis

Binomial name
- Utetheisa aruensis de Vos in 2007

Species of moth

Utetheisa aruensis is a moth in the family Erebidae. It was described by Rob de Vos in 2007. It is found on the Aru Islands of Indonesia.
