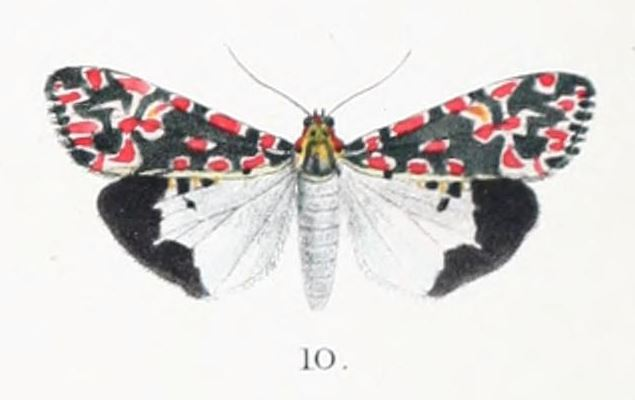

Scientific classification
- Domain: Eukaryota
- Kingdom: Animalia
- Phylum: Arthropoda
- Class: Insecta
- Order: Lepidoptera
- Superfamily: Noctuoidea
- Family: Erebidae
- Subfamily: Arctiinae
- Genus: Utetheisa
- Species: U. cruentata

Binomial name
- Utetheisa cruentata (Butler, 1881)

Synonyms
- Deiopeia cruentata Butler, 1881

= Utetheisa cruentata =

Species of moth

Utetheisa cruentata is a moth of the family Erebidae first described by Arthur Gardiner Butler in 1881. It is found on Mauritius in the Indian Ocean.

The larvae feed on Tournefortia argentea.
