= Utetheisa timorensis =

Scientific classification
- Domain: Eukaryota
- Kingdom: Animalia
- Phylum: Arthropoda
- Class: Insecta
- Order: Lepidoptera
- Superfamily: Noctuoidea
- Family: Erebidae
- Subfamily: Arctiinae
- Genus: Utetheisa
- Species: U. timorensis

Binomial name
- Utetheisa timorensis (Roepke, 1954)

Synonyms
- Nyctemera timorensis Roepke, 1954

Species of moth

Utetheisa timorensis is a moth in the family Erebidae. It was described by Walter Karl Johann Roepke in 1954. It is found on Timor.
