= Trichodesma microcalyx =

Conservation status
- Least Concern (IUCN 3.1)

Scientific classification
- Kingdom: Plantae
- Clade: Tracheophytes
- Clade: Angiosperms
- Clade: Eudicots
- Clade: Asterids
- Order: Boraginales
- Family: Boraginaceae
- Genus: Trichodesma
- Species: T. microcalyx

Binomial name
- Trichodesma microcalyx Balf.f.

Synonyms
- Boraginella microcalyx (Balf.f.) Kuntze

Species of plant

Trichodesma microcalyx is a species of plant in the family Boraginaceae.

== Distribution and habitation ==
It is endemic to the Hajhir Mountains of Socotra in Yemen. Its natural habitats are subtropical or tropical dry forests and subtropical or tropical dry shrubland.
