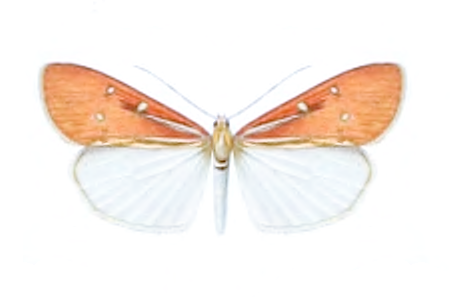
- Utetheisa sumatrana imago

Scientific classification
- Kingdom: Animalia
- Phylum: Arthropoda
- Class: Insecta
- Order: Lepidoptera
- Superfamily: Noctuoidea
- Family: Erebidae
- Subfamily: Arctiinae
- Subtribe: Callimorphina
- Genus: Utetheisa; Hübner, [1819]

Type species
- Phalaena ornatrix Linnaeus, 1758

Synonyms
- Atasca Swinhoe, 1892; Deiopeia Curtis, 1827; Deiopeia Stephens, 1829 (non Curtis, 1827: preoccupied); Exitelica Turner, 1921; Pitasila Moore, 1877; Raanya De Vos, 2007; Utethesia (lapsus); Uthetheisa (lapsus)

= Utetheisa =

Genus of moths

Utetheisa is a genus of tiger moths in the family Erebidae. The genus was first described by Jacob Hübner in 1819.

== Description ==
Palpi porrect (extending forward), extending beyond the frons. Antennae ciliated. Forewings long and narrow, where the outer margin is short and somewhat erect. Vein 3 from before angle of cell. Veins 4 and 5 from angle, vein 6 from upper angle and vein 7 to 10 from a short areole. Hindwing with vein 5 from above angle of cell. Vein 6 and 7 from upper angle and vein 8 from middle of cell.

Caterpillars of many Utetheisa species feed on Crotalaria (rattlebox), and hence the genus as a whole is often called rattlebox moths. The adults usually have bright aposematic coloration and contain toxic pyrrolizidine alkaloids, which are used as a chemical defense and are also incorporated into the sex pheromones of the males.

== Taxonomy ==
The members of its subgenera Pitasila, Atasca, and Raanya were formerly included in Nyctemera. Utetheisa is placed in the tribe Callimorphina or in the Nyctemerina; some treatments merge the two subtribes.

Utetheisa is monophyletic.

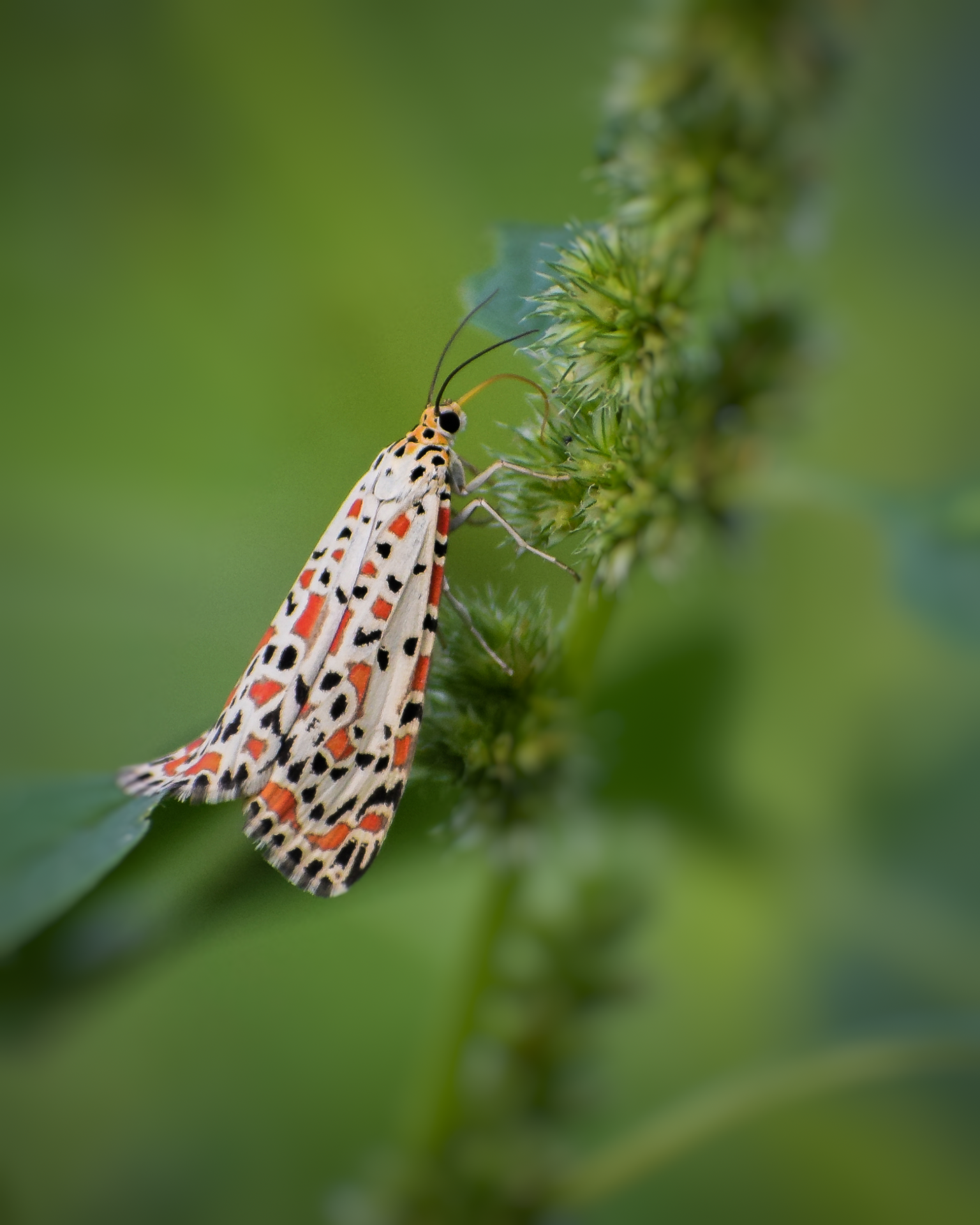
Utetheisa pulchelloides

== Selected species ==
Species of Utetheisa include:

Subgenus Utetheisa

- Utetheisa amhara Jordan, 1939
- Utetheisa antennata Swinhoe, 1893
- Utetheisa clareae Robinson, 1971
- Utetheisa connerorum Roque-Albelo & Landry, 2009
- Utetheisa cruentata (Butler, 1881)
- Utetheisa devriesi Hayes, 1975
- Utetheisa diva (Mabille, 1879)
- Utetheisa elata (Fabricius, 1798)
  - Utetheisa elata fatela Jordan, 1939
  - Utetheisa elata fatua Heyn, 1906
- Utetheisa galapagensis (Wallengren, 1860)
- Utetheisa henrii Roque-Albelo & Landry, 2009
- Utetheisa lactea (Butler, 1884)
  - Utetheisa lactea aldabrensis T. B. Fletcher, 1910
- Utetheisa lotrix (Cramer, [1777]) – crotalaria moth
- Utetheisa maddisoni Robinson & Robinson, 1980
- Utetheisa ornatrix (Linnaeus, 1758) – ornate moth, bella moth
- Utetheisa pectinata
- Utetheisa perryi Hayes, 1975
- Utetheisa pulchella (Linnaeus, 1758) – crimson-speckled flunkey
- Utetheisa pulchelloides Hampson, 1907 – heliotrope moth (syn: Utetheisa dorsifumata Prout, 1920)
- Utetheisa salomonis
- Utetheisa semara Moore, 1860
- Utetheisa sumatrana Rothschild, 1910

Subgenus Atasca

- Utetheisa aegrotum (Swinhoe, 1892)
- Utetheisa albilinea De Vos, 2007
- Utetheisa amboina De Vos, 2007
- Utetheisa amosa (Swinhoe, 1903)
- Utetheisa ampatica De Vos, 2007
- Utetheisa aruensis De Vos, 2007
- Utetheisa bouruana (Swinhoe, 1917)
- Utetheisa ceramensis De Vos, 2007
- Utetheisa externa (Swinhoe, 1917)
- Utetheisa frosti (Prout, 1918)
- Utetheisa pellex (Linnaeus, 1758)
- Utetheisa separata (Walker, 1864)
- Utetheisa watubela De Vos, 2007

Subgenus Raanya

- Utetheisa albipuncta (Druce, 1888)
  - Utetheisa albipuncta zoilides (Prout, 1920)

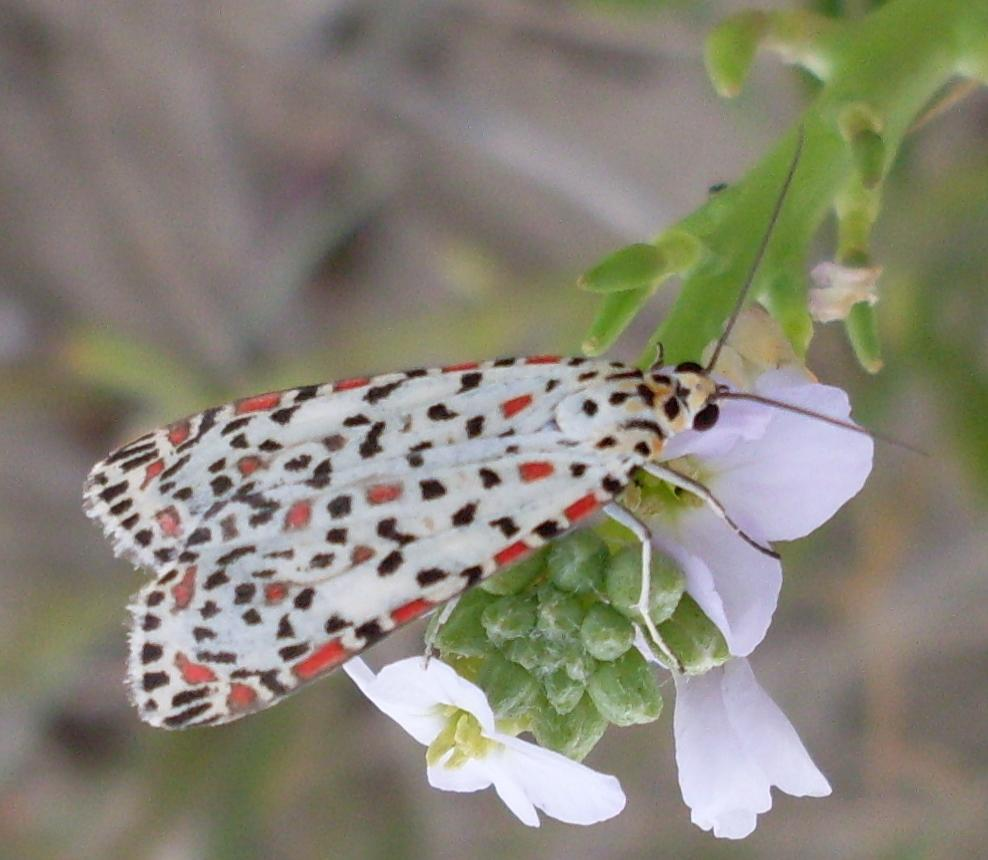
Heliotrope moth (Utetheisa pulchelloides)

Subgenus Pitasila

- Utetheisa assamica De Vos, 2007
- Utetheisa abraxoides (Walker, 1862)
- Utetheisa balinensis De Vos, 2007
- Utetheisa disrupta (Butler, 1887)
  - Utetheisa disrupta burica (Holland, 1900)
- Utetheisa distincta (Swinhoe, 1903) (syn: Utetheisa sangira (Swinhoe, 1903))
- Utetheisa inconstans (Butler, 1880) (syn: Utetheisa okinawensis (Inoue, 1982))
- Utetheisa flavothoracica De Vos, 2007
- Utetheisa fractifascia (Wileman, 1911)
- Utetheisa guttulosa (Walker, 1864)
- Utetheisa latifascia (Hopffer, 1874)
- Utetheisa leucospilota (Moore, 1877)
- Utetheisa limbata (Roepke, 1949)
- Utetheisa mendax De Vos, 2007
- Utetheisa nivea De Vos, 2007
- Utetheisa pala (Röber, 1891)
- Utetheisa selecta (Walker, 1854)
- Utetheisa specularis (Walker, 1856) (syn: Utetheisa macklotti (Vollenhoven, 1863))
  - Utetheisa specularis extendens De Vos, 2007
  - Utetheisa specularis oroya (Swinhoe, 1903)
- Utetheisa timorensis (Roepke, 1954)
- Utetheisa transiens (Jurriaanse & Lindemans, 1919)
- Utetheisa vandenberghi (Nieuwenhuis, 1948)
- Utetheisa varians (Walker, 1854)
- Utetheisa variolosa (Felder & Rogenhofer, [1869] 1874)
- Utetheisa vollenhovii (Snellen, 1890)
- Utetheisa witti De Vos, 2007
- Utetheisa ypsilon De Vos, 2007
