= Utetheisa selecta =

Scientific classification
- Kingdom: Animalia
- Phylum: Arthropoda
- Class: Insecta
- Order: Lepidoptera
- Superfamily: Noctuoidea
- Family: Erebidae
- Subfamily: Arctiinae
- Genus: Utetheisa
- Species: U. selecta

Binomial name
- Utetheisa selecta (Walker, 1854)

Synonyms
- Nyctemera selecta Walker, 1854; Nyctemera bijunctella Walker, 1866; Pitasila bipunctella Kirby, 1892; Leptosoma maculosum Felder, [1868], 1869; Deilemera semperi Swinhoe, 1903

Species of moth

Utetheisa selecta is a moth in the family Erebidae. It was described by Francis Walker in 1854. It is found in the Philippines.
