= Utetheisa frosti =

Scientific classification
- Kingdom: Animalia
- Phylum: Arthropoda
- Clade: Pancrustacea
- Class: Insecta
- Order: Lepidoptera
- Superfamily: Noctuoidea
- Family: Erebidae
- Subfamily: Arctiinae
- Genus: Utetheisa
- Species: U. frosti

Binomial name
- Utetheisa frosti (Prout, 1918)

Synonyms
- Nyctemera frosti Prout, 1920

Species of moth

Utetheisa frosti is a moth in the family Erebidae. It was described by Louis Beethoven Prout in 1918. It is found on the Key Islands.
