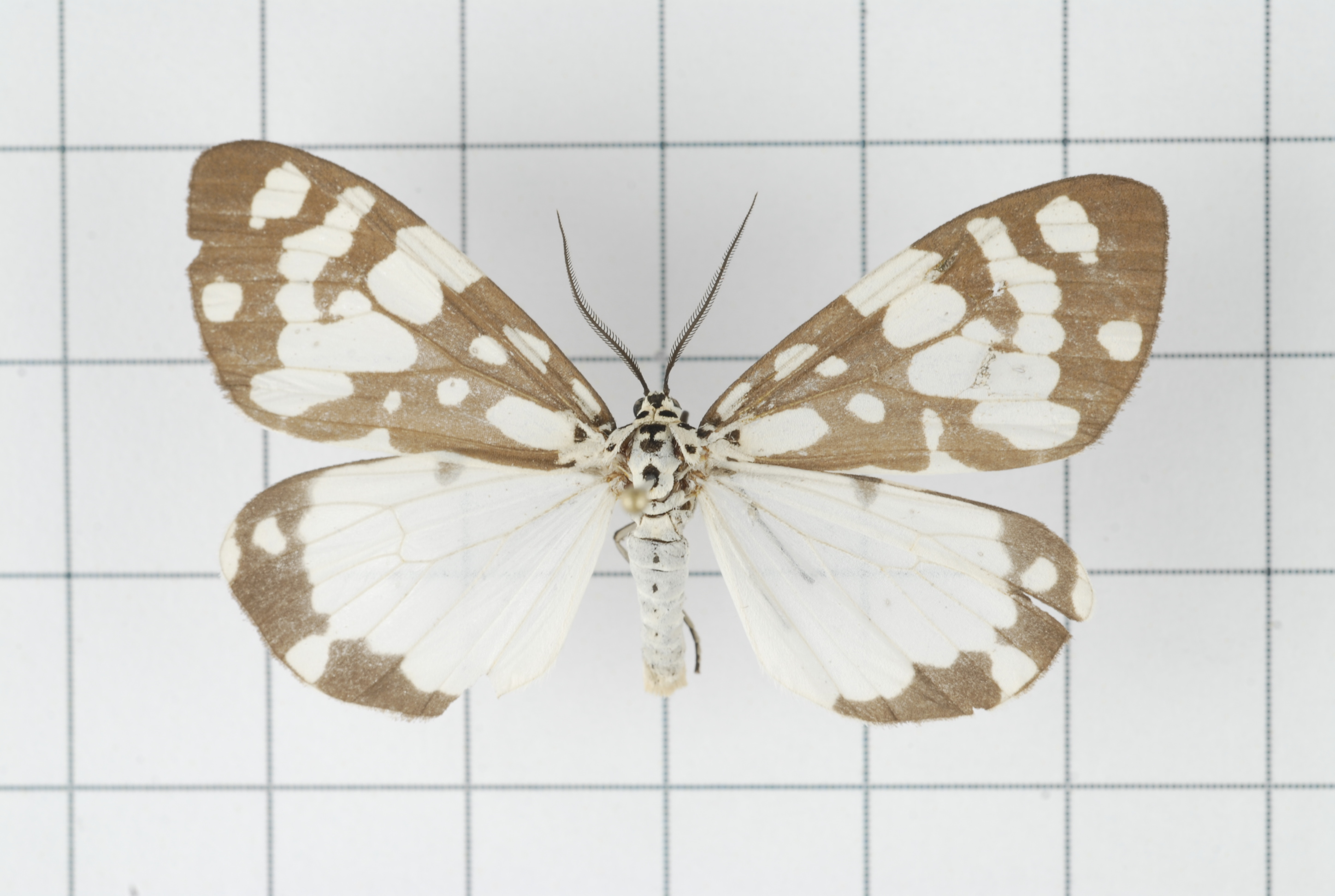

Scientific classification
- Domain: Eukaryota
- Kingdom: Animalia
- Phylum: Arthropoda
- Class: Insecta
- Order: Lepidoptera
- Superfamily: Noctuoidea
- Family: Erebidae
- Subfamily: Arctiinae
- Genus: Utetheisa
- Species: U. fractifascia

Binomial name
- Utetheisa fractifascia (Wileman, 1911)

Synonyms
- Nyctemera fractifascia Wileman, 1911; Pitasila fractifascia; Nyctemera basistrigata Reich, 1932

= Utetheisa fractifascia =

Species of moth

Utetheisa fractifascia is a moth in the family Erebidae. It was described by Alfred Ernest Wileman in 1911. It is found in Taiwan.
