= Utetheisa latifascia =

Scientific classification
- Domain: Eukaryota
- Kingdom: Animalia
- Phylum: Arthropoda
- Class: Insecta
- Order: Lepidoptera
- Superfamily: Noctuoidea
- Family: Erebidae
- Subfamily: Arctiinae
- Genus: Utetheisa
- Species: U. latifascia

Binomial name
- Utetheisa latifascia (Hopffer, 1874)

Synonyms
- Leptosoma latifascia Hopffer, 1874

Species of moth

Utetheisa latifascia is a moth in the family Erebidae. It was described by Carl Heinrich Hopffer in 1874. It is found on Sulawesi.
