= Utetheisa albipuncta =

Scientific classification
- Domain: Eukaryota
- Kingdom: Animalia
- Phylum: Arthropoda
- Class: Insecta
- Order: Lepidoptera
- Superfamily: Noctuoidea
- Family: Erebidae
- Subfamily: Arctiinae
- Genus: Utetheisa
- Species: U. albipuncta

Binomial name
- Utetheisa albipuncta (Druce, 1888)

Synonyms
- Deilemera albipuncta Druce, 1888; Nyctemera albipuncta zoilides Prout, 1920; Deilemera albipuncta bougainvillensis Strand in Niepelt & Strand, 1916

Species of moth

Utetheisa albipuncta is a moth in the family Erebidae. It was described by Druce in 1888. It is found on the Solomon Islands and the Bismarck Archipelago.

== Subspecies ==
- Utetheisa albipuncta albipuncta (Solomon Islands)
- Utetheisa albipuncta zoilides Prout, 1920 (Bismarck Archipelago: Rook Island, New Britain and New Ireland)
