= Utetheisa antennata =

Scientific classification
- Domain: Eukaryota
- Kingdom: Animalia
- Phylum: Arthropoda
- Class: Insecta
- Order: Lepidoptera
- Superfamily: Noctuoidea
- Family: Erebidae
- Subfamily: Arctiinae
- Genus: Utetheisa
- Species: U. antennata

Binomial name
- Utetheisa antennata (C. Swinhoe, 1893)

Synonyms
- Deiopeia antennata C. Swinhoe, 1893

Species of moth

Utetheisa antennata is a moth in the family Erebidae. It was described by Charles Swinhoe in 1893. It is found on the Nicobar Islands in the Indian Ocean.
