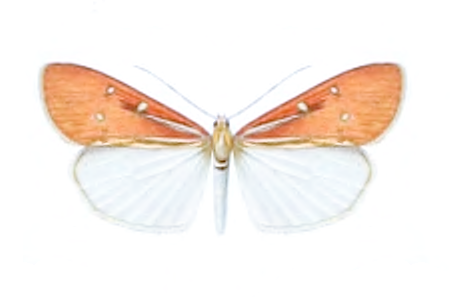

Scientific classification
- Kingdom: Animalia
- Phylum: Arthropoda
- Class: Insecta
- Order: Lepidoptera
- Superfamily: Noctuoidea
- Family: Erebidae
- Subfamily: Arctiinae
- Genus: Utetheisa
- Species: U. sumatrana

Binomial name
- Utetheisa sumatrana Rothschild, 1910

= Utetheisa sumatrana =

Species of moth

Utetheisa sumatrana is a moth of the family Erebidae first described by Walter Rothschild in 1910. It is found on north-eastern Sumatra.
