= Utetheisa flavothoracica =

Scientific classification
- Domain: Eukaryota
- Kingdom: Animalia
- Phylum: Arthropoda
- Class: Insecta
- Order: Lepidoptera
- Superfamily: Noctuoidea
- Family: Erebidae
- Subfamily: Arctiinae
- Genus: Utetheisa
- Species: U. flavothoracica

Binomial name
- Utetheisa flavothoracica De Vos, 2007

Species of moth

Utetheisa flavothoracica is a moth in the family Erebidae. It was described by Rob de Vos in 2007. It is found in the Philippines.

== Subspecies ==
- Utetheisa flavothoracica flavothoracica
- Utetheisa flavothoracica camarinensis de Vos, 2007 (Philippines: southern Luzon)
