= Utetheisa witti =

Scientific classification
- Domain: Eukaryota
- Kingdom: Animalia
- Phylum: Arthropoda
- Class: Insecta
- Order: Lepidoptera
- Superfamily: Noctuoidea
- Family: Erebidae
- Subfamily: Arctiinae
- Genus: Utetheisa
- Species: U. witti

Binomial name
- Utetheisa witti De Vos, 2007

Species of moth

Utetheisa witti is a moth in the family Erebidae. It was described by Rob de Vos in 2007. It is found in the Philippine islands of Mindanao and Negros.
