= Utetheisa guttulosa =

Scientific classification
- Kingdom: Animalia
- Phylum: Arthropoda
- Class: Insecta
- Order: Lepidoptera
- Superfamily: Noctuoidea
- Family: Erebidae
- Subfamily: Arctiinae
- Genus: Utetheisa
- Species: U. guttulosa

Binomial name
- Utetheisa guttulosa (Walker, 1864)

Synonyms
- Nyctemera guttulosa Walker, 1864; Nyctemera abraxata Snellen, 1879

Species of moth

Utetheisa guttulosa is a moth in the family Erebidae. It was described by Francis Walker in 1864. It is found on Sulawesi.
