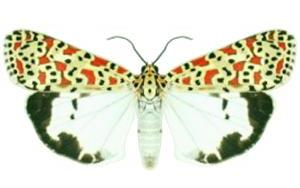

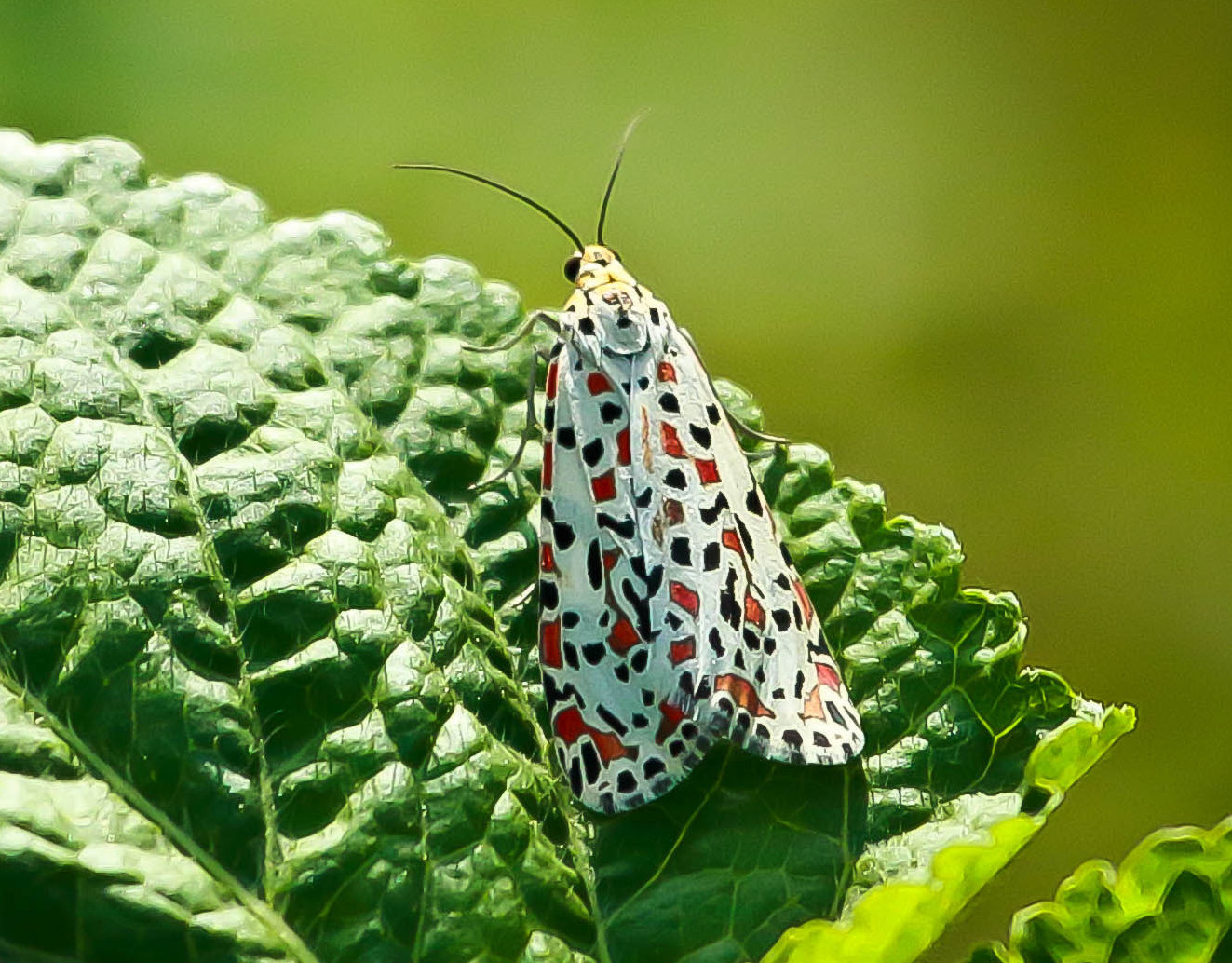

Scientific classification
- Domain: Eukaryota
- Kingdom: Animalia
- Phylum: Arthropoda
- Class: Insecta
- Order: Lepidoptera
- Superfamily: Noctuoidea
- Family: Erebidae
- Subfamily: Arctiinae
- Genus: Utetheisa
- Species: U. lotrix

Binomial name
- Utetheisa lotrix (Cramer, [1777])

Synonyms
- Geometra lotrix Cramer, [1777]; Utetheisa rubra Rothschild, 1914; Utetheisa lutescens Roepke, 1941; Utetheisa indica Roepke, 1941; Utetheisa stigmata Rothschild, 1910; Utetheisa socotrensis Jordan, 1939; Deiopeia lepida Rambur, [1866]; Utetheisa pulchella tenuella Seitz, 1910

= Utetheisa lotrix =

Salt-and-pepper moth

Species of moth

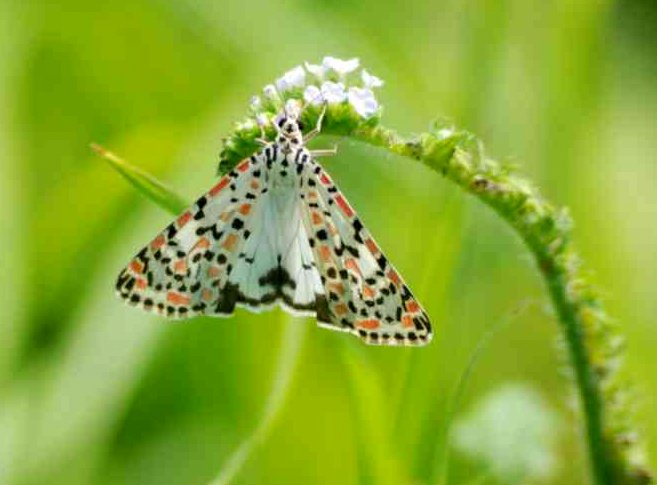
In Kolkata, West Bengal, India

Utetheisa lotrix, the salt-and-pepper moth or crotalaria moth, is a moth of the family Erebidae. The species was first described by Pieter Cramer in 1777. It is found in most of the Old World tropics.

The wingspan is about 30 mm.

The larvae feed on Crotalaria species.

== Subspecies ==
- Utetheisa lotrix lotrix (Cramer, [1777]) – southern Iran, Pakistan, India, Seychelles, Sri-Lanka, China, Japan, New Guinea, Australia, New Zealand
- Utetheisa lotrix stigmata Rothschild, 1910 – Loyalty Islands, New Caledonia, New Hebrides, Fiji, Solomons, Samoa, Tonga, Niue
- Utetheisa lotrix lepida (Rambur, [1866]) – Madagascar, Réunion
- Utetheisa lotrix socotrensis Jordan, 1939 – Socotra Island
