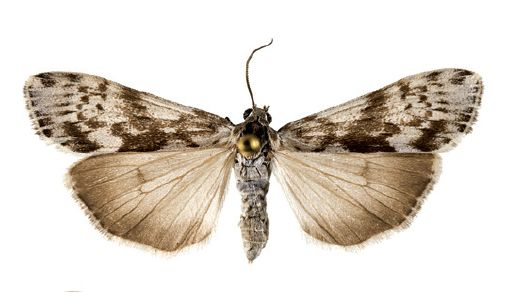

Scientific classification
- Kingdom: Animalia
- Phylum: Arthropoda
- Class: Insecta
- Order: Lepidoptera
- Superfamily: Noctuoidea
- Family: Erebidae
- Subfamily: Arctiinae
- Genus: Utetheisa
- Species: U. galapagensis

Binomial name
- Utetheisa galapagensis (Wallengren, 1860)

Synonyms
- Euchelia galapagenis Wallengren, 1860; Euchelia gallopagensis Wallengren, 1861

= Utetheisa galapagensis =

Species of moth

Utetheisa galapagensis is a moth of the family Erebidae. It is known only from the Galápagos island of San Cristóbal. It is probably endemic to the archipelago.

Larvae have been reared on Tournefortia pubescens, but probably also feed on other Tournefortia species.
