= Utetheisa ampatica =

Scientific classification
- Domain: Eukaryota
- Kingdom: Animalia
- Phylum: Arthropoda
- Class: Insecta
- Order: Lepidoptera
- Superfamily: Noctuoidea
- Family: Erebidae
- Subfamily: Arctiinae
- Genus: Utetheisa
- Species: U. ampatica

Binomial name
- Utetheisa ampatica De Vos, 2007

Species of moth

Utetheisa ampatica is a moth in the family Erebidae. It was described by Rob de Vos in 2007. It is found in Papua New Guinea, where it has been recorded from the Raja Ampat Islands of Salawati and Waigeo.
