= Utetheisa leucospilota =

Scientific classification
- Domain: Eukaryota
- Kingdom: Animalia
- Phylum: Arthropoda
- Class: Insecta
- Order: Lepidoptera
- Superfamily: Noctuoidea
- Family: Erebidae
- Subfamily: Arctiinae
- Genus: Utetheisa
- Species: U. leucospilota

Binomial name
- Utetheisa leucospilota (Moore, 1877)

Synonyms
- Pitasila leucospilota Moore, 1877

Species of moth

Utetheisa leucospilota is a moth in the family Erebidae. It was described by Frederic Moore in 1877. It is found on the Andaman Islands.
