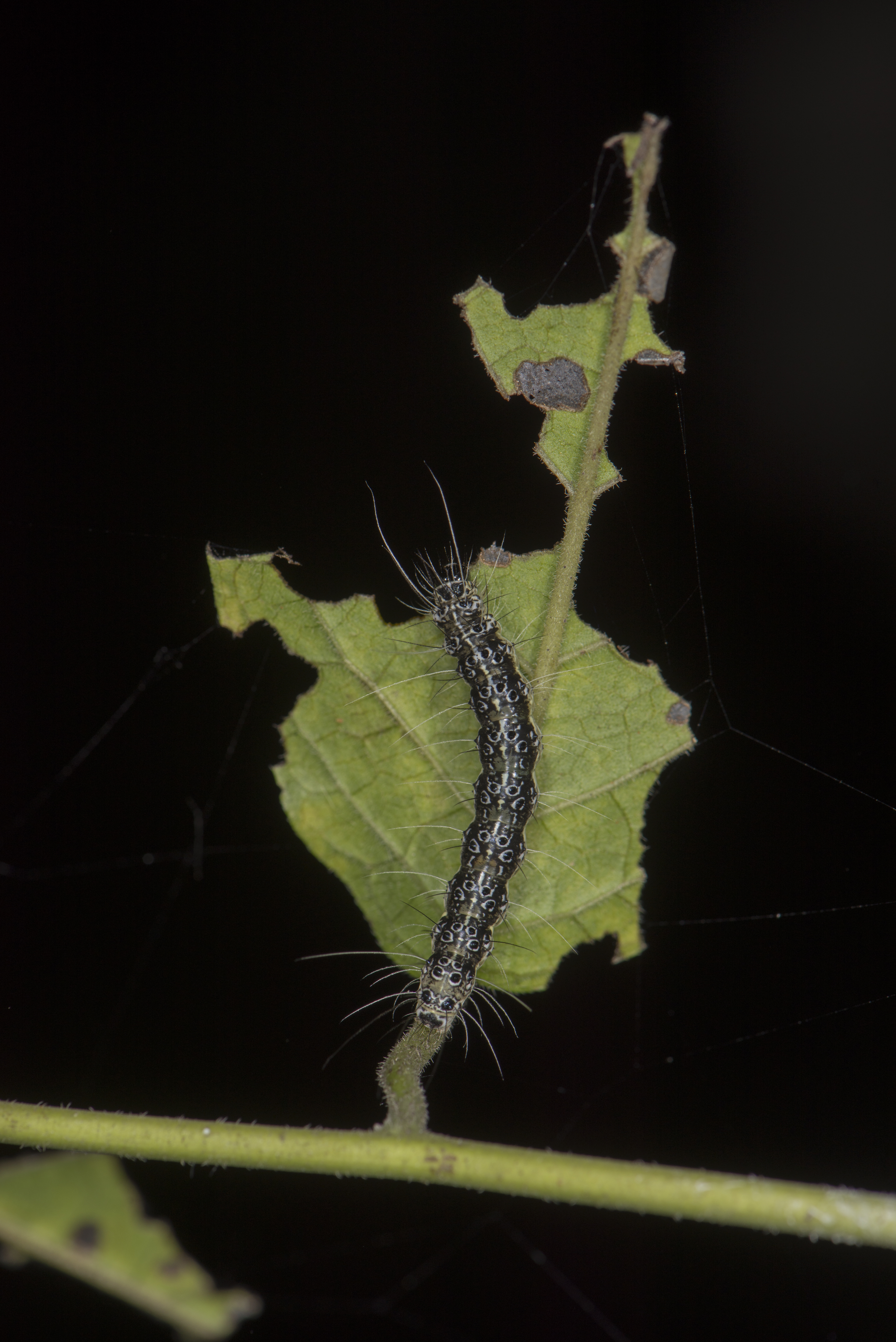

Scientific classification
- Domain: Eukaryota
- Kingdom: Animalia
- Phylum: Arthropoda
- Class: Insecta
- Order: Lepidoptera
- Superfamily: Noctuoidea
- Family: Erebidae
- Subfamily: Arctiinae
- Genus: Utetheisa
- Species: U. inconstans

Binomial name
- Utetheisa inconstans (Butler, 1880)

Synonyms
- Pitasila inconstans Butler, 1880; Nyctemera brylancik Bryk, 1937; Nyctemera okinawensis Inoue, 1982

= Utetheisa inconstans =

Species of moth

Utetheisa inconstans is a moth in the family Erebidae. It was described by Arthur Gardiner Butler in 1880. It is found in Japan (Tokunoshima, Okinawa, Iriomote, Minami) and Taiwan.
