= Utetheisa perryi =

Scientific classification
- Domain: Eukaryota
- Kingdom: Animalia
- Phylum: Arthropoda
- Class: Insecta
- Order: Lepidoptera
- Superfamily: Noctuoidea
- Family: Erebidae
- Subfamily: Arctiinae
- Genus: Utetheisa
- Species: U. perryi

Binomial name
- Utetheisa perryi Hayes, 1975

Species of moth

Utetheisa perryi is a moth in the family Erebidae. It was described by Alan H. Hayes in 1975. It is found on the Galápagos Islands.
