= Utetheisa variolosa =

Scientific classification
- Domain: Eukaryota
- Kingdom: Animalia
- Phylum: Arthropoda
- Class: Insecta
- Order: Lepidoptera
- Superfamily: Noctuoidea
- Family: Erebidae
- Subfamily: Arctiinae
- Genus: Utetheisa
- Species: U. variolosa

Binomial name
- Utetheisa variolosa (C. Felder, R. Felder & Rogenhofer, [1869] 1874)

Synonyms
- Nyctemera variolosa Felder & Rogenhofer, [1869]; Nyctemera nicobarensis Reich, 1932

Species of moth

Utetheisa variolosa is a moth in the family Erebidae. It was described by Cajetan Felder, Rudolf Felder and Alois Friedrich Rogenhofer in 1869. It is found on the Nicobar Islands in the eastern Indian Ocean.
