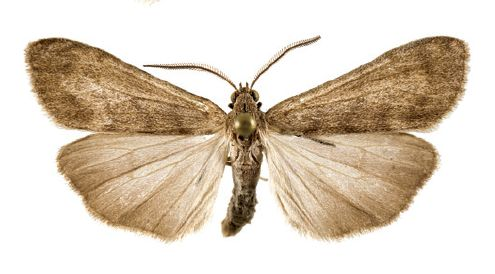

Scientific classification
- Kingdom: Animalia
- Phylum: Arthropoda
- Clade: Pancrustacea
- Class: Insecta
- Order: Lepidoptera
- Superfamily: Noctuoidea
- Family: Erebidae
- Subfamily: Arctiinae
- Genus: Utetheisa
- Species: U. connerorum

Binomial name
- Utetheisa connerorum Roque-Albelo & B. Landry, 2009

= Utetheisa connerorum =

Species of moth

Utetheisa connerorum is a moth of the family Erebidae. It is endemic to the Galapagos archipelago, where it is the most widespread of all Utetheisa species. It has been found on Baltra, Fernandina, Floreana, Genovesa, Isabela, Marchena, Pinta, San Cristóbal, Santa Cruz, Santa Fé, and Santiago.

The food plants contain pyrrolizidine alkaloids, which are also stored in the adult moths.
