= Utetheisa amosa =

Scientific classification
- Domain: Eukaryota
- Kingdom: Animalia
- Phylum: Arthropoda
- Class: Insecta
- Order: Lepidoptera
- Superfamily: Noctuoidea
- Family: Erebidae
- Subfamily: Arctiinae
- Genus: Utetheisa
- Species: U. amosa

Binomial name
- Utetheisa amosa (C. Swinhoe, 1903)

Synonyms
- Deilemera amosa C. Swinhoe, 1903; Nyctemera pellex pervecta Prout, 1920; Nyctemera letensis Reich, 1932

Species of moth

Utetheisa amosa is a moth in the family Erebidae. It was described by Charles Swinhoe in 1903. It is found on the southern Moluccas.
