= Utetheisa externa =

Scientific classification
- Domain: Eukaryota
- Kingdom: Animalia
- Phylum: Arthropoda
- Class: Insecta
- Order: Lepidoptera
- Superfamily: Noctuoidea
- Family: Erebidae
- Subfamily: Arctiinae
- Genus: Utetheisa
- Species: U. externa

Binomial name
- Utetheisa externa (C. Swinhoe, 1917)

Synonyms
- Deilemera externa C. Swinhoe, 1917

Species of moth

Utetheisa externa is a moth in the family Erebidae. It was described by Charles Swinhoe in 1917. It is found on the Bacan Islands of Indonesia.
