= Utetheisa vandenberghi =

Scientific classification
- Domain: Eukaryota
- Kingdom: Animalia
- Phylum: Arthropoda
- Class: Insecta
- Order: Lepidoptera
- Superfamily: Noctuoidea
- Family: Erebidae
- Subfamily: Arctiinae
- Genus: Utetheisa
- Species: U. vandenberghi

Binomial name
- Utetheisa vandenberghi (Nieuwenhuis, 1948)

Synonyms
- Nyctemera vandenberghi Nieuwenhuis, 1948

Species of moth

Utetheisa vandenberghi is a moth in the family Erebidae. It was described by Nieuwenhuis in 1948. It is found on Sulawesi and Bali.
