= Trichodesma scottii =

Conservation status
- Vulnerable (IUCN 3.1)

Scientific classification
- Kingdom: Plantae
- Clade: Tracheophytes
- Clade: Angiosperms
- Clade: Eudicots
- Clade: Asterids
- Order: Boraginales
- Family: Boraginaceae
- Genus: Trichodesma
- Species: T. scottii

Binomial name
- Trichodesma scottii Balf.f.

Species of flowering plant

Trichodesma scottie is a species of plant in the family Boraginaceae. It is endemic to Socotra in Yemen. It is known from a few areas, where it is locally common in mountain thickets. It is a shrub producing cream-colored, funnel-shaped flowers in hanging inflorescences "that resemble the head of an upturned mop".
