= Trichodesma laxiflorum =

Conservation status
- Least Concern (IUCN 3.1)

Scientific classification
- Kingdom: Plantae
- Clade: Tracheophytes
- Clade: Angiosperms
- Clade: Eudicots
- Clade: Asterids
- Order: Boraginales
- Family: Boraginaceae
- Genus: Trichodesma
- Species: T. laxiflorum

Binomial name
- Trichodesma laxiflorum Balf.f.

Synonyms
- Boraginella laxiflora (Balf.f.) Kuntze; Trichodesma atrichum Vierh.

Species of plant

Trichodesma laxiflorum is a species of plant in the family Boraginaceae. It is endemic to Yemen. Its natural habitats are subtropical or tropical dry forests and subtropical or tropical dry shrubland.
