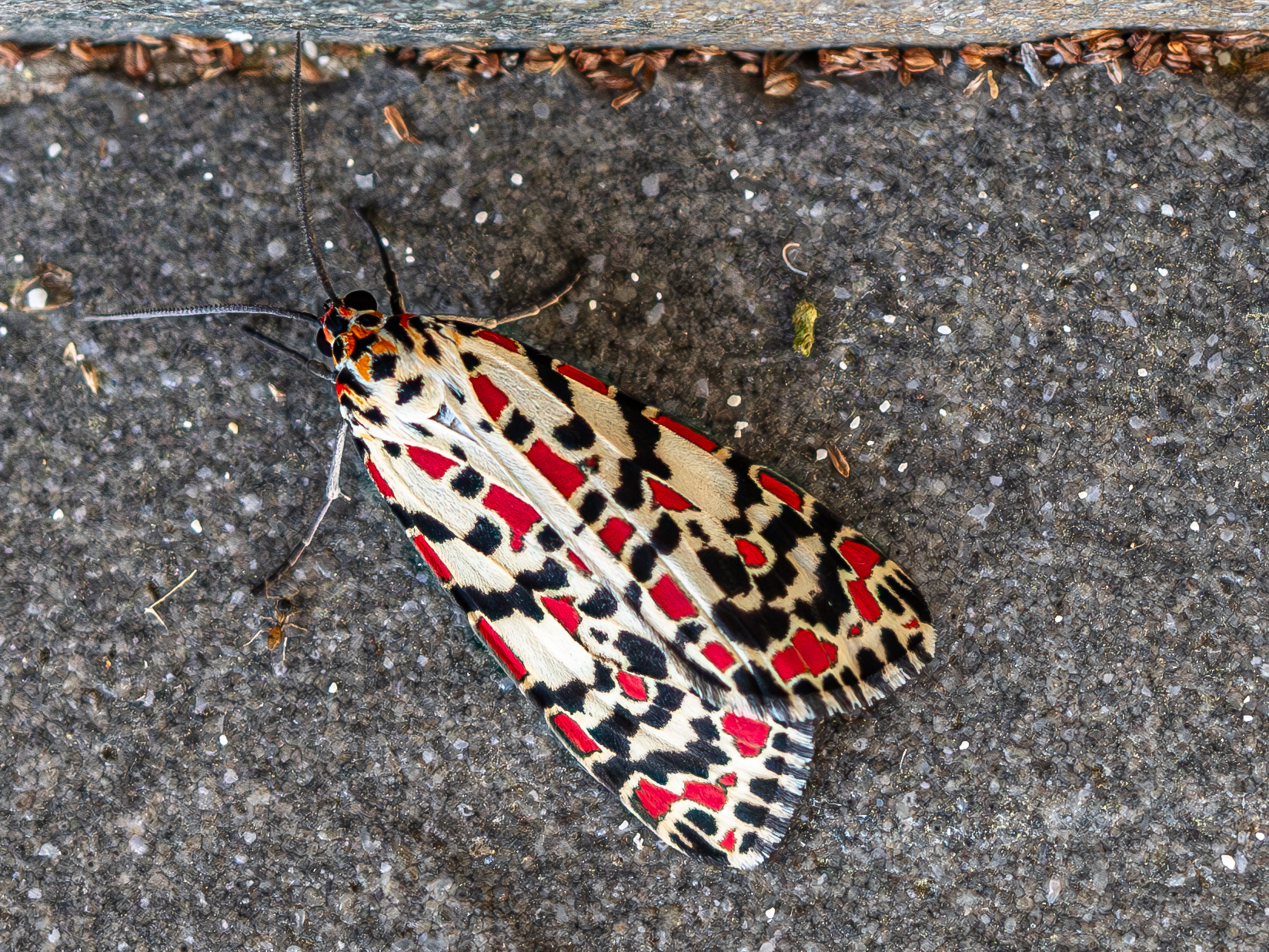

Scientific classification
- Domain: Eukaryota
- Kingdom: Animalia
- Phylum: Arthropoda
- Class: Insecta
- Order: Lepidoptera
- Superfamily: Noctuoidea
- Family: Erebidae
- Subfamily: Arctiinae
- Genus: Utetheisa
- Species: U. salomonis

Binomial name
- Utetheisa salomonis Rothschild, 1910

Synonyms
- Utetheisa pectinata ruberrima Rothschild, 1910

= Utetheisa salomonis =

Species of moth

Utetheisa salomonis is a disputed moth species of the family Erebidae. It is found on the Loyalty Islands, the New Hebrides, the Solomon Islands, New Britain, Fiji and New Caledonia.

Utetheisa pectinata ruberrima is now considered a synonym of U. salomonis. However, U. salomonis may itself belong into Utetheisa pulchelloides.
