= Utetheisa distincta =

Scientific classification
- Domain: Eukaryota
- Kingdom: Animalia
- Phylum: Arthropoda
- Class: Insecta
- Order: Lepidoptera
- Superfamily: Noctuoidea
- Family: Erebidae
- Subfamily: Arctiinae
- Genus: Utetheisa
- Species: U. distincta

Binomial name
- Utetheisa distincta (C. Swinhoe, 1903)

Synonyms
- Deilemera distincta C. Swinhoe, 1903; Deilemera sangira C. Swinhoe, 1903; Utetheisa sangira

Species of moth

Utetheisa distincta is a moth in the family Erebidae. It was described by Charles Swinhoe in 1903. It is found on Siau Island in the Sangihe Islands of Indonesia.
