= Utetheisa disrupta =

Scientific classification
- Domain: Eukaryota
- Kingdom: Animalia
- Phylum: Arthropoda
- Class: Insecta
- Order: Lepidoptera
- Superfamily: Noctuoidea
- Family: Erebidae
- Subfamily: Arctiinae
- Genus: Utetheisa
- Species: U. disrupta

Binomial name
- Utetheisa disrupta (Butler, 1887)

Synonyms
- Pitasila disrupta Butler, 1887; Nyctemera burica Holland, 1900; Deilemera similis Swinhoe, 1917; Nyctemera angalensis Matsumura, 1930

Species of moth

Utetheisa disrupta is a moth in the family Erebidae. It was described by Arthur Gardiner Butler in 1887. It is found in the Philippines (Negros), on the Caroline Islands, Sumatra, the Natuna Islands, Sulawesi, the Moluccas, Irian Jaya, New Guinea, the Solomon Islands and in Micronesia (Angal).

== Subspecies ==
- Utetheisa disrupta disrupta
- Utetheisa disrupta burica (Holland, 1900)
