= Utetheisa specularis =

Scientific classification
- Kingdom: Animalia
- Phylum: Arthropoda
- Class: Insecta
- Order: Lepidoptera
- Superfamily: Noctuoidea
- Family: Erebidae
- Subfamily: Arctiinae
- Genus: Utetheisa
- Species: U. specularis

Binomial name
- Utetheisa specularis (Walker, 1856)

Synonyms
- Nyctemera specularis Walker, 1856; Nyctemera confluens Felder, 1861; Leptosoma macklotti Snellen van Vollenhoven, 1863; Deilemera nonapicalis Rothschild, 1915; Deilemera gonora Swinhoe, 1917; Deilemera oroya Swinhoe, 1903

Species of moth

Utetheisa specularis is a moth in the family Erebidae. It was described by Francis Walker in 1856. It is found in Indonesia.

== Subspecies ==
- Utetheisa specularis specularis (Walker, 1856) (Sulawesi, Moluccas, Seram, Flores, Amboina)
- Utetheisa specularis extendens de Vos, 2007 (Banggai Islands, Halmaheira, Obi)
- Utetheisa specularis oroya (Swinhoe, 1903) (Sula Islands, Moluccas, New Guinea)
