= Utetheisa semara =

Scientific classification
- Domain: Eukaryota
- Kingdom: Animalia
- Phylum: Arthropoda
- Class: Insecta
- Order: Lepidoptera
- Superfamily: Noctuoidea
- Family: Erebidae
- Subfamily: Arctiinae
- Genus: Utetheisa
- Species: U. semara

Binomial name
- Utetheisa semara Moore, 1860

Species of moth

Utetheisa semara is a moth in the family Erebidae. It was described by Frederic Moore in 1860. It is found on Java, Lombok and Sulawesi.
