= Utetheisa limbata =

Scientific classification
- Kingdom: Animalia
- Phylum: Arthropoda
- Class: Insecta
- Order: Lepidoptera
- Superfamily: Noctuoidea
- Family: Erebidae
- Subfamily: Arctiinae
- Genus: Utetheisa
- Species: U. limbata

Binomial name
- Utetheisa limbata Roepke, 1949

Species of moth

Utetheisa limbata is a moth in the family Erebidae. It was described by Walter Karl Johann Roepke in 1949.

== Distribution ==
Utetheisa limbata is found on Sulawesi.
