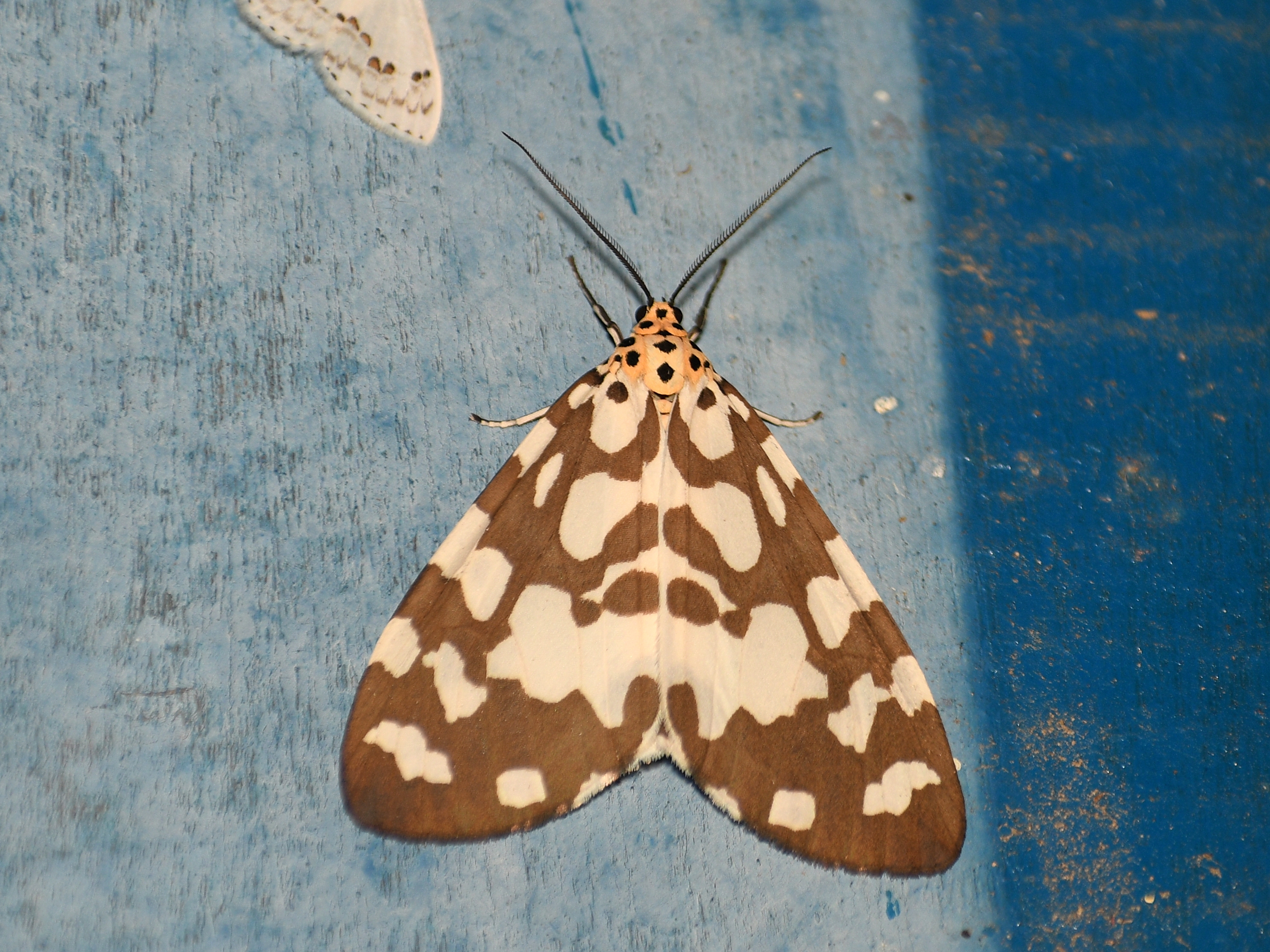

Scientific classification
- Kingdom: Animalia
- Phylum: Arthropoda
- Class: Insecta
- Order: Lepidoptera
- Superfamily: Noctuoidea
- Family: Erebidae
- Subfamily: Arctiinae
- Genus: Utetheisa
- Species: U. varians

Binomial name
- Utetheisa varians (Walker, 1854)

Synonyms
- Nyctemera varians Walker, 1854; Pitasila moolaica Moore, 1878

= Utetheisa varians =

Species of moth

Utetheisa varians is a moth in the family Erebidae. It was described by Francis Walker in 1854. It is found in China (Guangxi, Yunnan, Hainan), eastern and northern India, Bangladesh, Bhutan, Myanmar and Indochina.
