= Utetheisa clareae =

Scientific classification
- Domain: Eukaryota
- Kingdom: Animalia
- Phylum: Arthropoda
- Class: Insecta
- Order: Lepidoptera
- Superfamily: Noctuoidea
- Family: Erebidae
- Subfamily: Arctiinae
- Genus: Utetheisa
- Species: U. clareae

Binomial name
- Utetheisa clareae Robinson, 1971

Species of moth

Utetheisa clareae is a moth in the family Erebidae. It was described by Robinson in 1971. It is found on Fiji.
