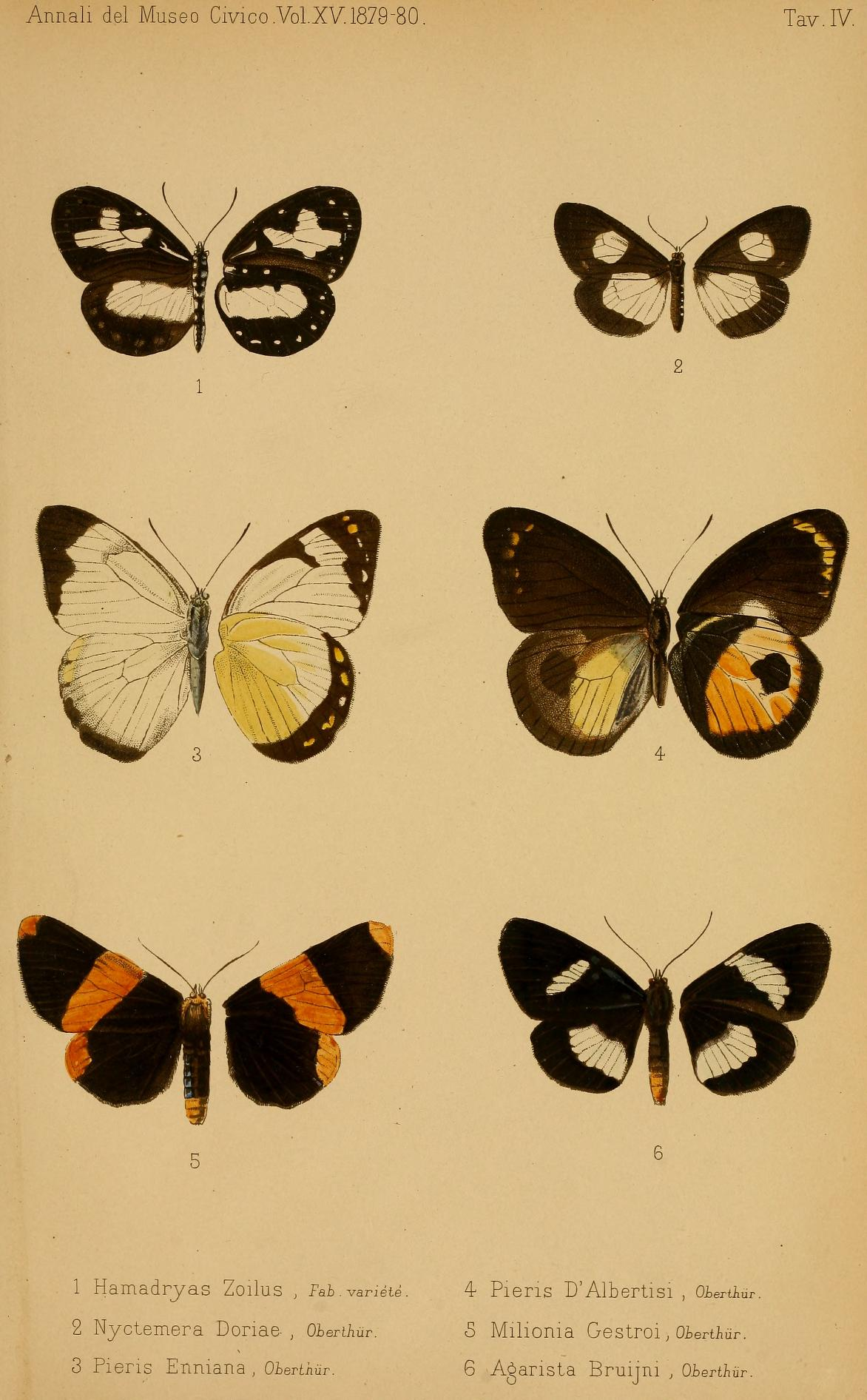
- Utetheisa pellex, serial number 2

Scientific classification
- Kingdom: Animalia
- Phylum: Arthropoda
- Class: Insecta
- Order: Lepidoptera
- Superfamily: Noctuoidea
- Family: Erebidae
- Subfamily: Arctiinae
- Genus: Utetheisa
- Species: U. pellex

Binomial name
- Utetheisa pellex (Linnaeus, 1758)

Synonyms
- Phalaena Noctua pellex Linnaeus, 1758; Leptosoma artemis Boisduval, 1832; Nyctemera simplex Walker, [1865]; Deilemera signata Butler, 1878; Nyctemera doriae Oberthür, 1880; Nyctemera pellex tangens Seitz, 1915; Deilemera paradelpha Swinhoe, 1917

= Utetheisa pellex =

Species of moth

Utetheisa pellex is a moth in the family Erebidae. It was described by Carl Linnaeus in 1758. It is found in New Guinea and surrounding islands (Waigeo, Salawati, Misool, Gebe, the Aru Islands, Supiori, Biak, Yapen, the Bismarck Archipelago, the Admiralty Islands, Vulcan Island, Dampier Island, D'Entrecasteaux Archipelago, the Louisiade Archipelago, Yule Island, the Darnley Islands), as well as in Australia (Queensland).
