= Utetheisa abraxoides =

Scientific classification
- Kingdom: Animalia
- Phylum: Arthropoda
- Class: Insecta
- Order: Lepidoptera
- Superfamily: Noctuoidea
- Family: Erebidae
- Subfamily: Arctiinae
- Genus: Utetheisa
- Species: U. abraxoides

Binomial name
- Utetheisa abraxoides (Walker, 1862)

Synonyms
- Nyctemera abraxoides Walker, 1862

Species of moth

Utetheisa abraxoides is a moth in the family Erebidae. It was described by Francis Walker in 1862. It is found on Borneo. The habitat consists of upper montane forests.
