= Utetheisa transiens =

Scientific classification
- Domain: Eukaryota
- Kingdom: Animalia
- Phylum: Arthropoda
- Class: Insecta
- Order: Lepidoptera
- Superfamily: Noctuoidea
- Family: Erebidae
- Subfamily: Arctiinae
- Genus: Utetheisa
- Species: U. transiens

Binomial name
- Utetheisa transiens (Jurriaanse & Lindemans, 1919)

Synonyms
- Nyctemera guttulosa transiens Jurriaanse & Lindemans, 1919

Species of moth

Utetheisa transiens is a moth in the family Erebidae. It was described by Jan Hendrick Jurriaanse and Johannus Lindemans in 1919. It is found in the Tukangbesi Islands of Indonesia.
