= Utetheisa vollenhovii =

Scientific classification
- Kingdom: Animalia
- Phylum: Arthropoda
- Class: Insecta
- Order: Lepidoptera
- Superfamily: Noctuoidea
- Family: Erebidae
- Subfamily: Arctiinae
- Genus: Utetheisa
- Species: U. vollenhovii

Binomial name
- Utetheisa vollenhovii (Snellen, 1890)

Synonyms
- Nyctermera vollenhovii Snellen, 1890

Species of moth

Utetheisa vollenhovii is a moth in the family Erebidae. It was described by Snellen in 1890. It is found on Sulawesi.
