= Utetheisa amboina =

Scientific classification
- Domain: Eukaryota
- Kingdom: Animalia
- Phylum: Arthropoda
- Class: Insecta
- Order: Lepidoptera
- Superfamily: Noctuoidea
- Family: Erebidae
- Subfamily: Arctiinae
- Genus: Utetheisa
- Species: U. amboina

Binomial name
- Utetheisa amboina De Vos, 2007

Species of moth

Utetheisa amboina is a moth in the family Erebidae. It was described by Rob de Vos in 2007. It is found on the Maluku Islands in Indonesia.
