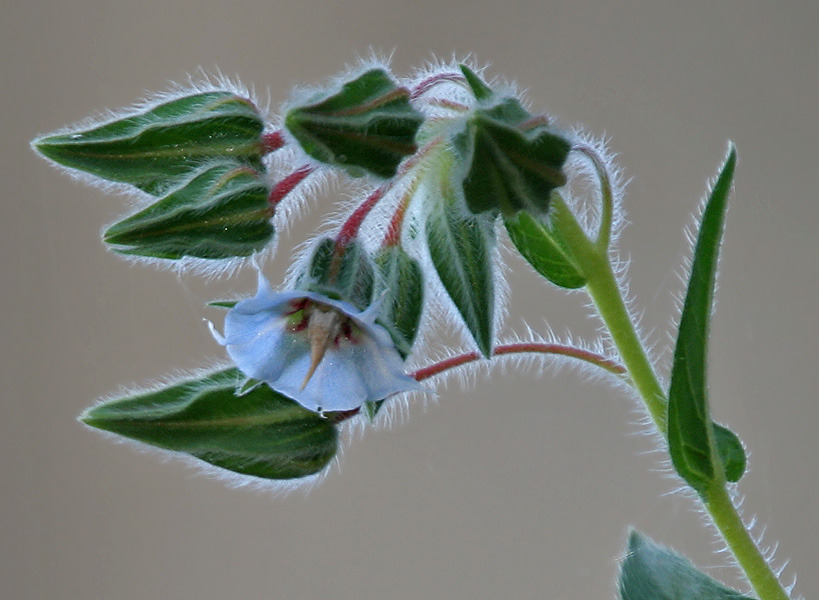
- Trichodesma indicum

Scientific classification
- Kingdom: Plantae
- Clade: Embryophytes
- Clade: Tracheophytes
- Clade: Spermatophytes
- Clade: Angiosperms
- Clade: Eudicots
- Clade: Asterids
- Order: Boraginales
- Family: Boraginaceae
- Subfamily: Boraginoideae
- Genus: Trichodesma; R.Br. (1810), nom. cons.

Type species
- Trichodesma zeylanicum (Burm.f.) R.Br.

Species
- 38; see text

Synonyms
- Boraginella Kuntze (1891); Boraginodes Post & Kuntze (1903); Borraginoides Boehm. (1760), nom. rej.; Friedrichsthalia Fenzl (1839); Lacaitaea Brand (1914); Leiocarya Hochst. (1844); Octosomatium Gagnep. (1950); Pollichia Medik. (1784), nom. superfl.; Spiroconus Steven (1851); Streblanthera Steud. (1844)

= Trichodesma =

Genus of flowering plants in the borage family

Trichodesma is a genus of flowering plants in the borage family, Boraginaceae. There are 38 species distributed in tropical and subtropical regions of Africa, Asia, and Australia.

== Species ==
38 species are accepted.

- Trichodesma aellenii Riedl
- Trichodesma afghanicum Sadat
- Trichodesma africanum (L.) Sm.
- Trichodesma angustifolium Harv.
- Trichodesma arenicola Gürke
- Trichodesma aucheri DC.
- Trichodesma bamianicum Rech.f. & Riedl
- Trichodesma baumii Gürke
- Trichodesma bequaertii De Wild.
- Trichodesma boissieri Post
- Trichodesma calcaratum Coss. ex Batt.
- Trichodesma calycosum Collett & Hemsl.
- Trichodesma cinereum Mosti & Selvi
- Trichodesma decurrens S.P.Banerjee
- Trichodesma ehrenbergii Schweinf.
- Trichodesma elymaiticum Mozaff.
- Trichodesma griffithii (Brand) Planch. ex Riedl
- Trichodesma hildebrandtii Gürke
- Trichodesma inaequale Edgew.
- Trichodesma incanum (Bunge) A.DC.
- Trichodesma indicum (L.) Sm.
- Trichodesma khasianum C.B.Clarke
- Trichodesma kumarianum S.D.Yumkham, N.P.Devi, S.D.Khomdram & M.R.Devi
- Trichodesma laxiflorum Balf.f.
- Trichodesma lithospermoides Roem. & Schult.
- Trichodesma macrocarpum Rech.f., Aellen & Esfand.
- Trichodesma marsabiticum Brummitt
- Trichodesma microcalyx Balf.f.
- Trichodesma mudgalii An.Kumar & K.K.Khanna
- Trichodesma paktiense Sadat
- Trichodesma physaloides (Fenzl) DC.
- Trichodesma podlechii Sadat
- Trichodesma scottii Balf.f.
- Trichodesma stocksii Boiss.
- Trichodesma zeylanicum (Burm.f.) R.Br.
