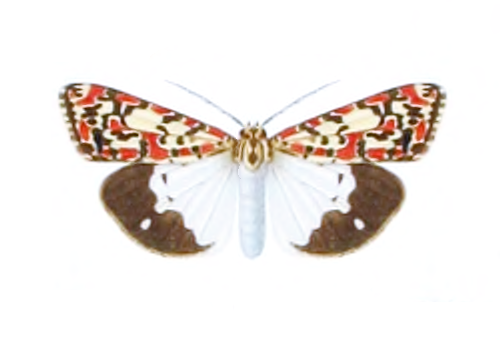

Scientific classification
- Kingdom: Animalia
- Phylum: Arthropoda
- Class: Insecta
- Order: Lepidoptera
- Superfamily: Noctuoidea
- Family: Erebidae
- Subfamily: Arctiinae
- Genus: Utetheisa
- Species: U. pectinata

Binomial name
- Utetheisa pectinata Hampson, 1907

= Utetheisa pectinata =

Species of moth

Utetheisa pectinata is a moth of the family Erebidae first described by George Hampson in 1907. It is found on the islands of Arafura Sea (Moa, Dammer, Tiandoe and Tam, Tenimber, Little Key) and in Australia (where it is only known from the coastal strip of the Northern Territory).

== Taxonomy ==
The subspecies Utetheisa pectinata ruberrima is now considered a synonym of Utetheisa salomonis.
