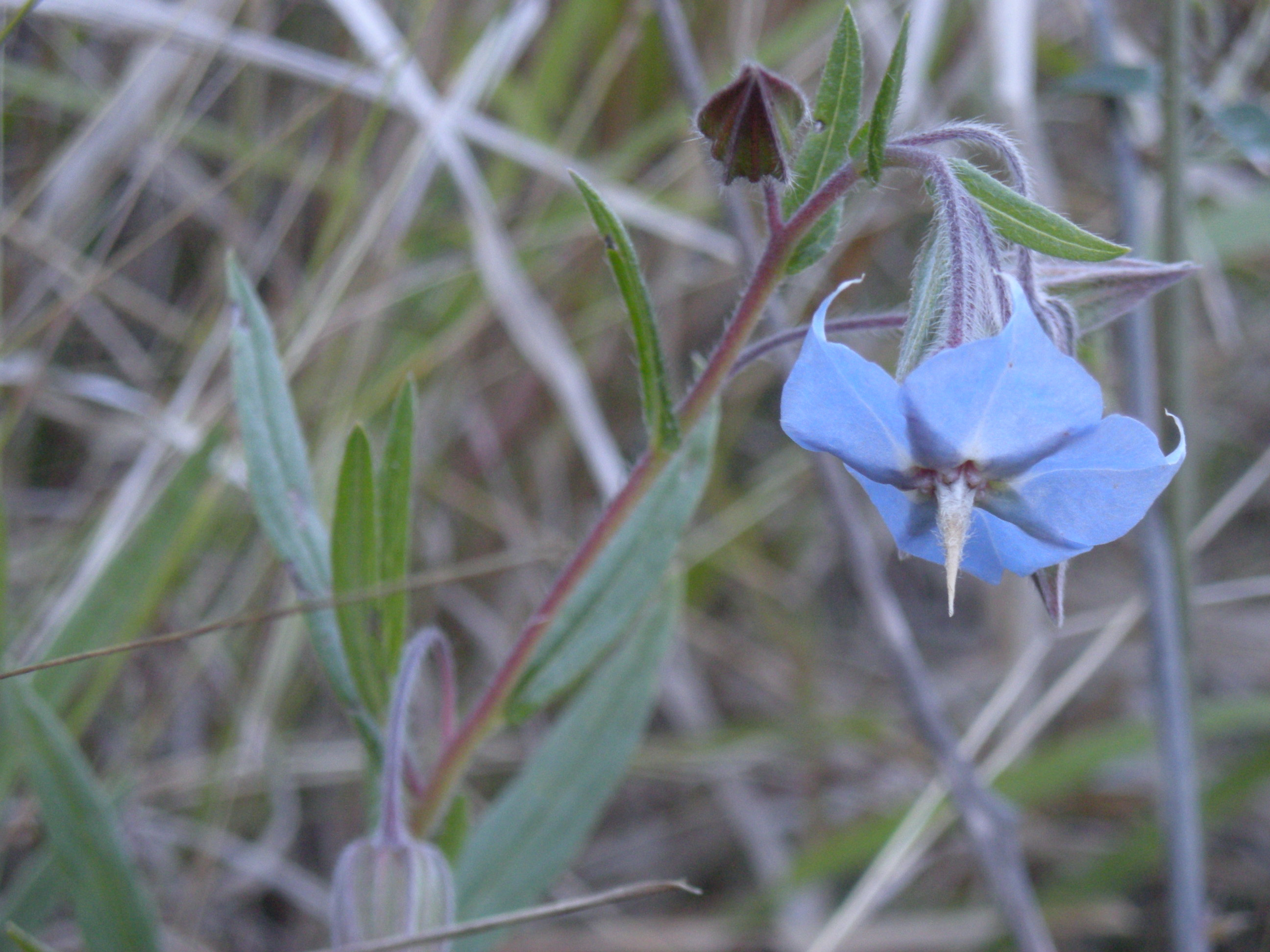

Scientific classification
- Kingdom: Plantae
- Clade: Tracheophytes
- Clade: Angiosperms
- Clade: Eudicots
- Clade: Asterids
- Order: Boraginales
- Family: Boraginaceae
- Genus: Trichodesma
- Species: T. zeylanicum

Binomial name
- Trichodesma zeylanicum (Burm.f.) R.Br.

= Trichodesma zeylanicum =

Species of plant

Trichodesma zeylanicum, commonly known as Northern bluebell, camel bush or cattle bush, is a herb or shrub native to Australia.

== Description ==
It grows as an erect herb or shrub up to two metres high, with a well-developed taproot. Flowers are blue, or rarely white.

== Taxonomy ==
This species was first published as Borago zeylanica by Nicolaas Laurens Burman in 1768. In 1810, Robert Brown transferred it into Trichodesma, but this was retained only until 1882, when Ferdinand von Mueller transferred it into Pollichia. In 1891, Otto Kuntze transferred it into Boraginella, and in 1898 William Philip Hiern transferred it into Borraginoides. Despite these many later transfers, it is Brown's placement that is currently accepted.

=== Varieties ===
Three varieties are recognised:

- T. zeylanicum var. grandiflorum
- T. zeylanicum var. latisepalum
- T. zeylanicum var. zeylanicum

== Distribution and habitat ==
It is fairly widespread in Australia, occurring in Western Australia, the Northern Territory, South Australia, Queensland and New South Wales.

== Gallery ==
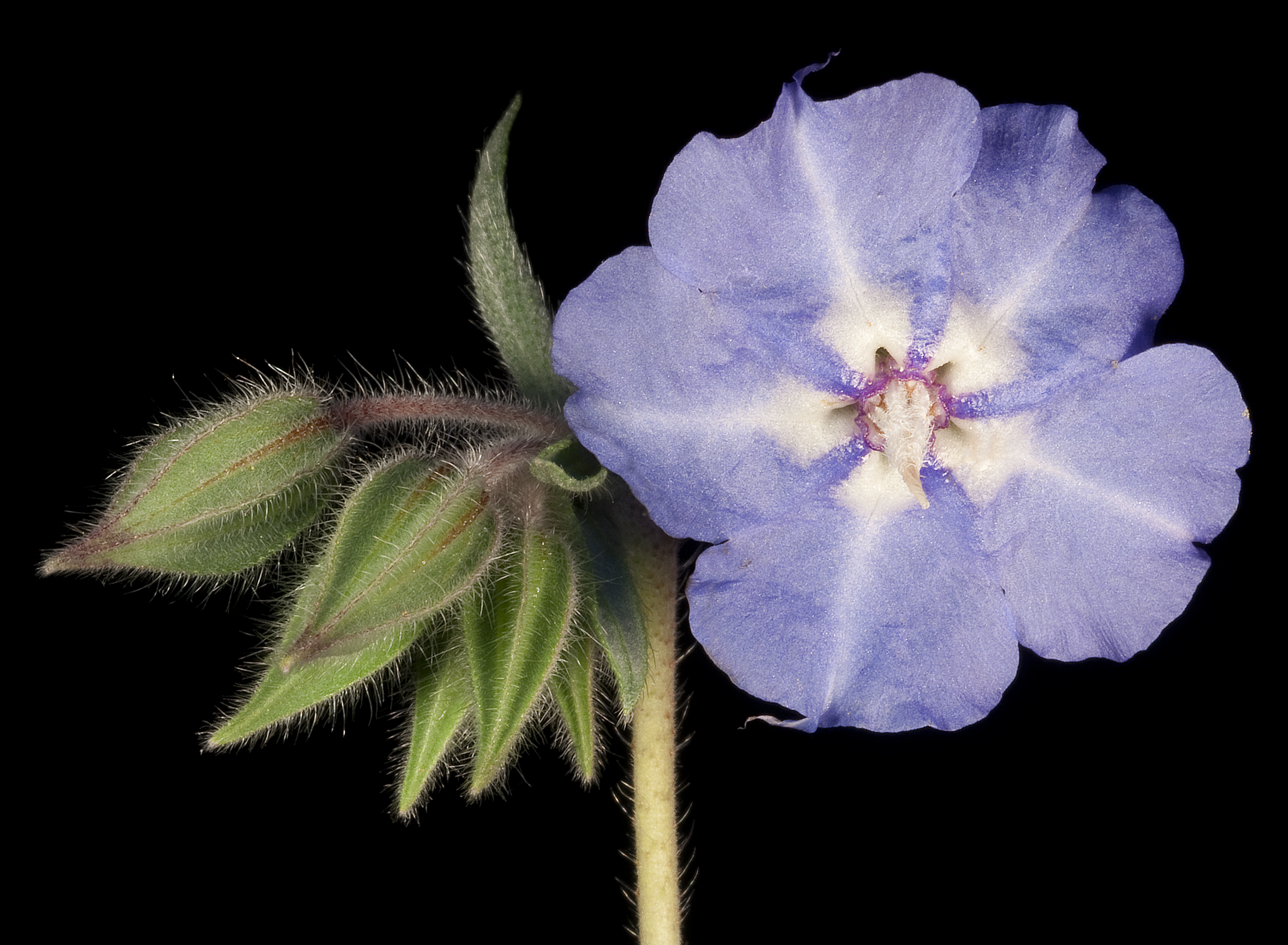

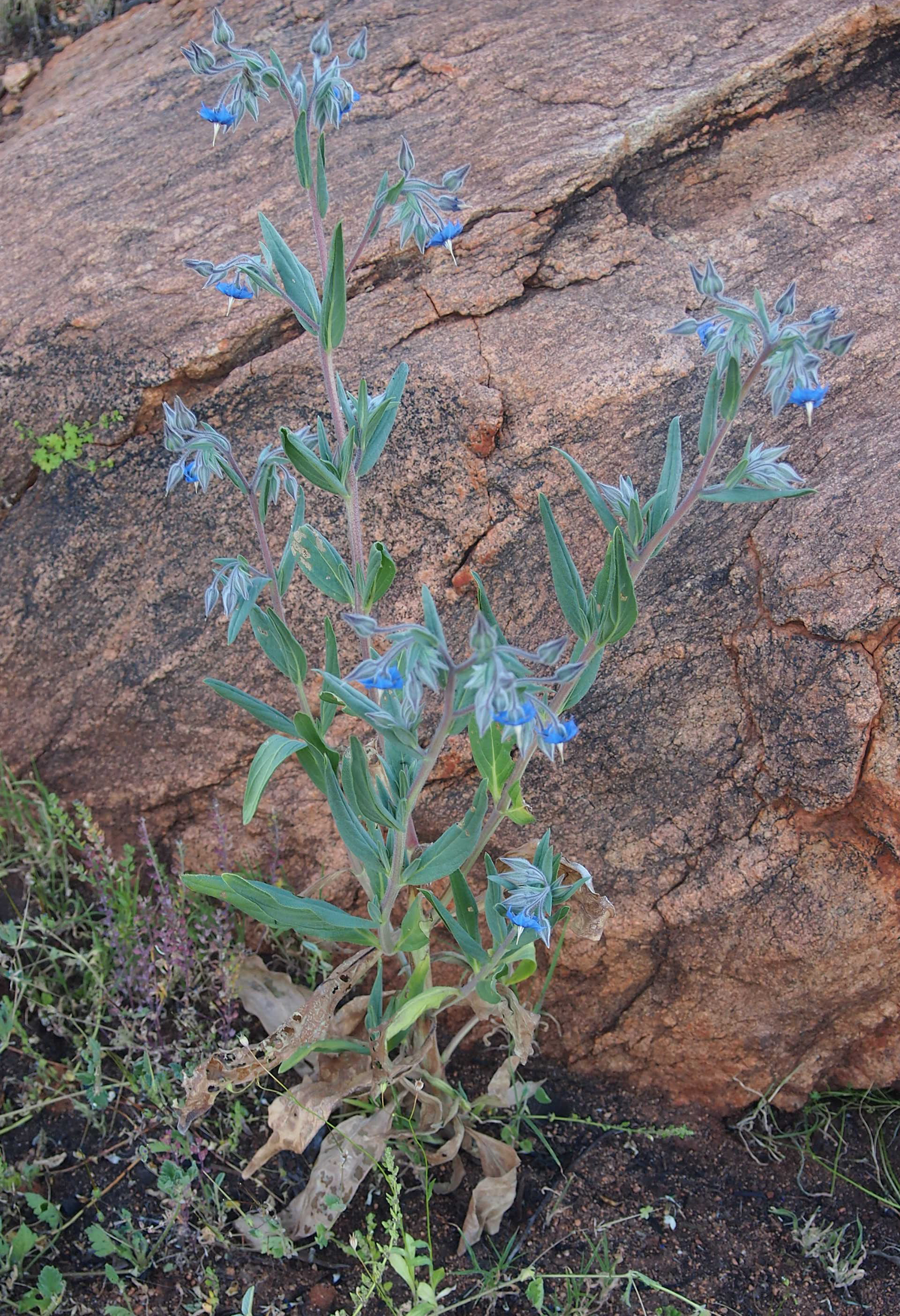

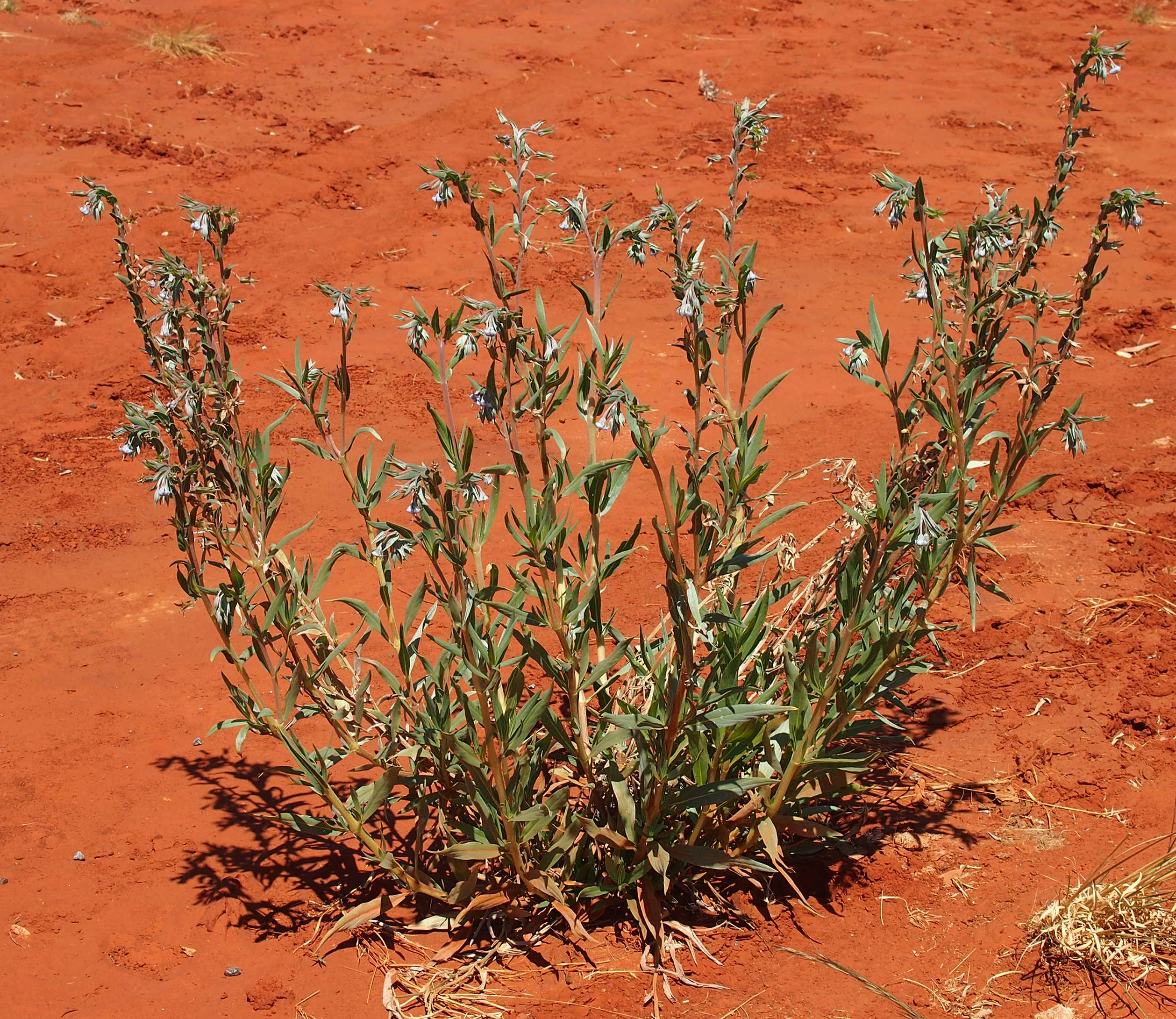

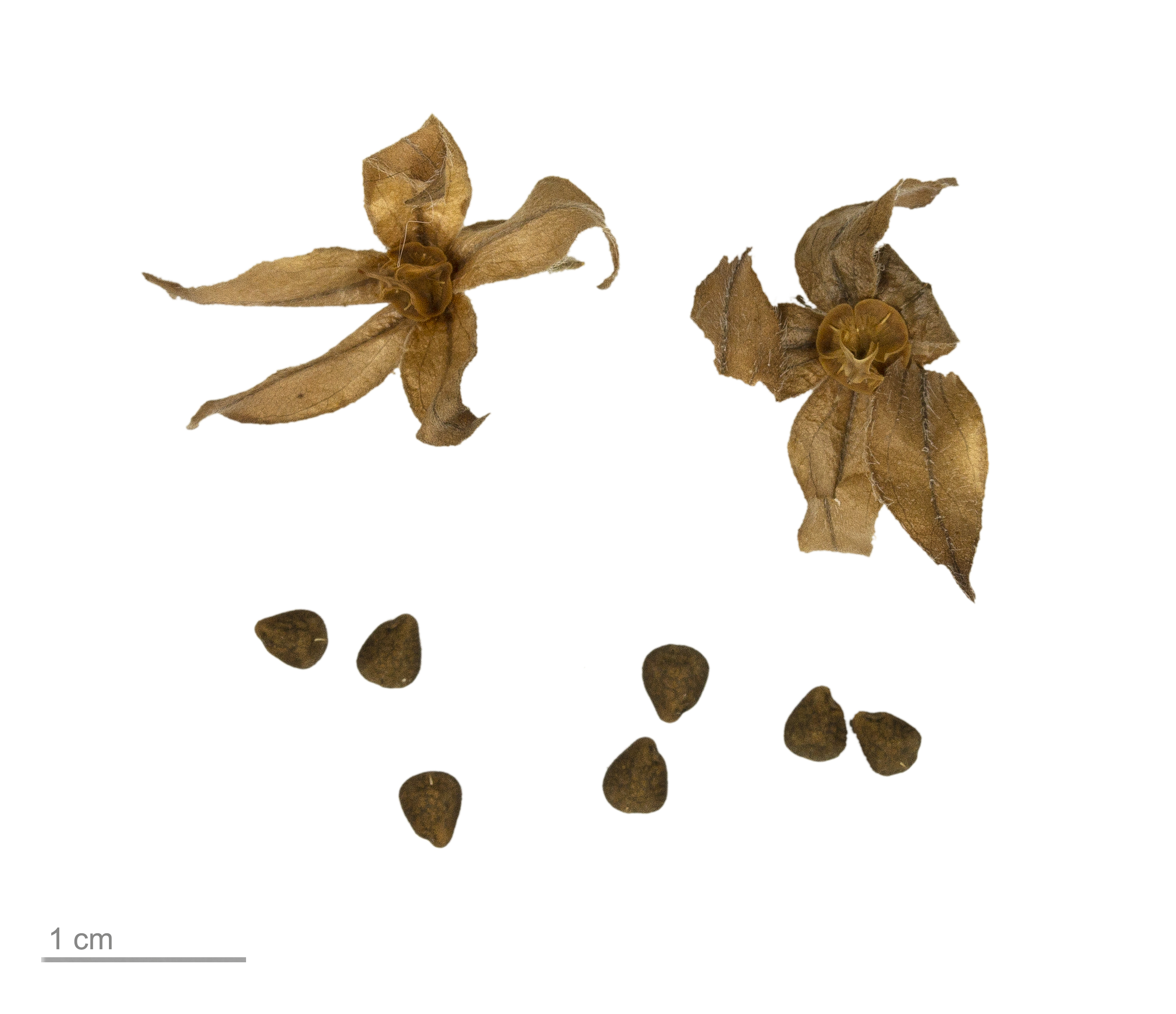
Trichodesma zeylanicum - MHNT
