= Mosaic plant =

- Mosaic plant is a common name for several plants and may refer to:
- Fittonia albivenis, a plant with leaf veins contrasting in color with the rest of the leaf, giving it a mosaic-like appearance with irregular shapes
- Ludwigia sedioides, an aquatic plant with clusters of floating rhomboid leaves, which have a tessellated mosaic-like appearance
Plants called mosaic plant
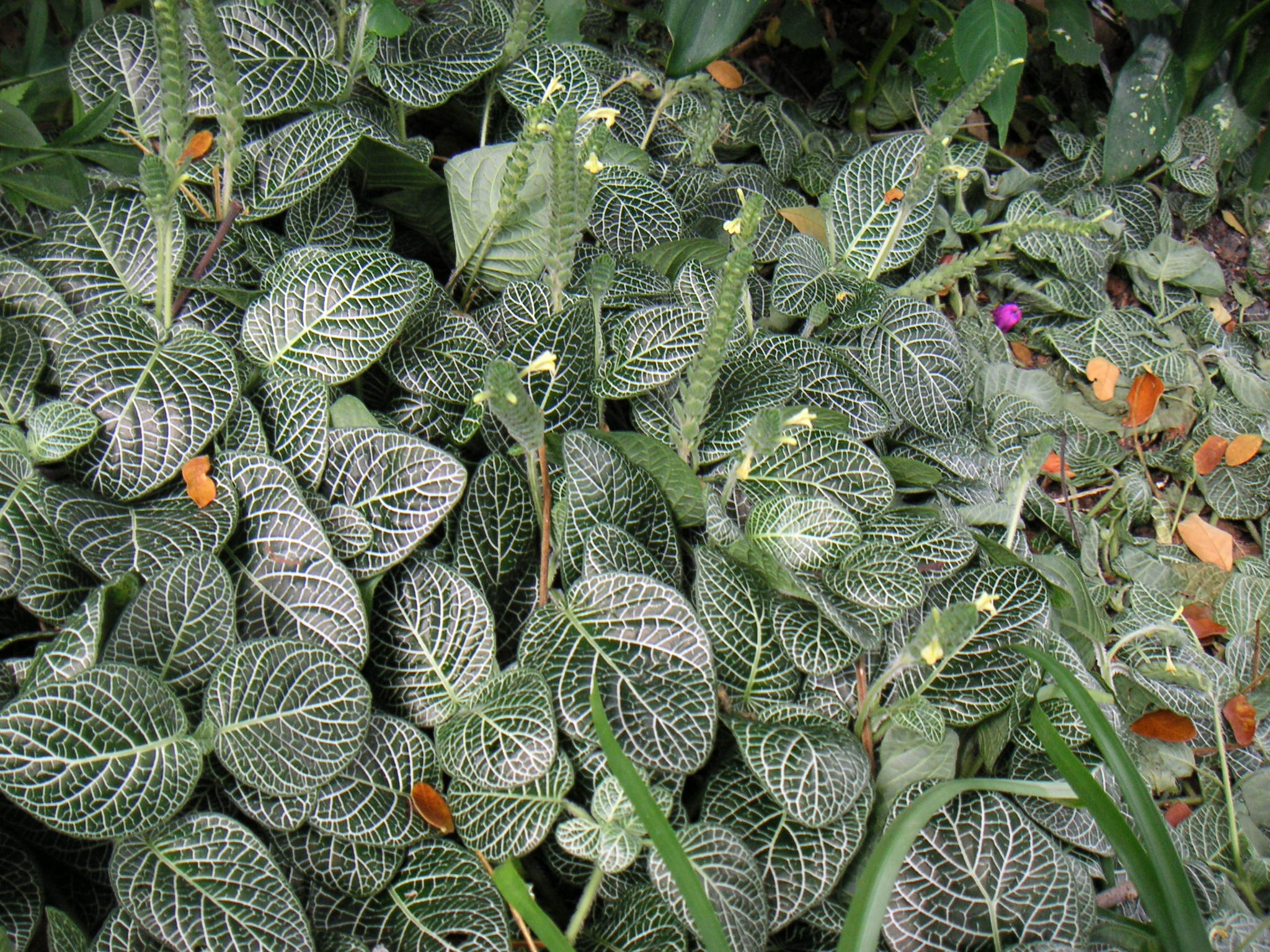
Leaves of Fittonia albivenis

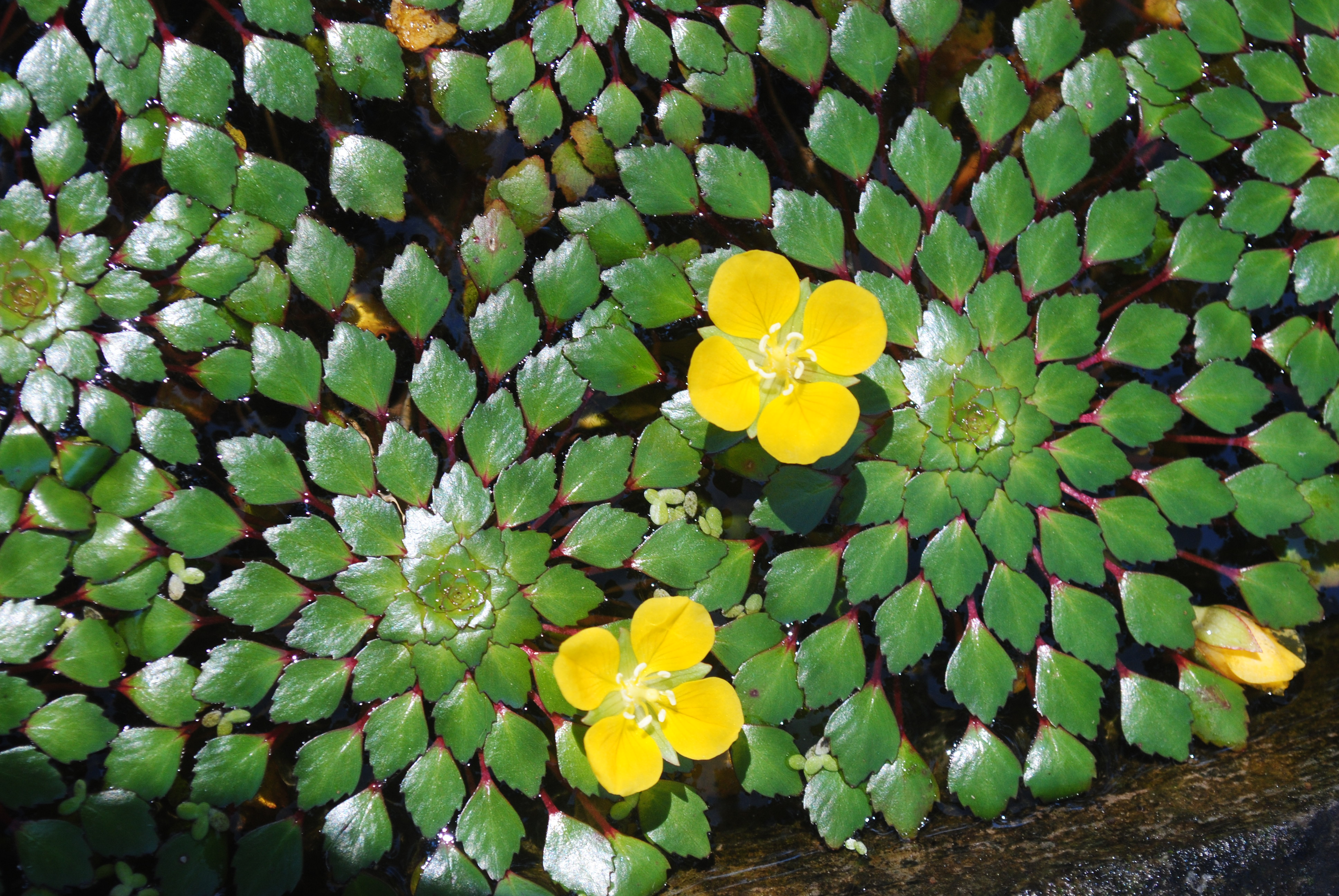
Leaves and flowers of Ludwigia sedioides
