= Hypoestes pubescens =

Conservation status
- Least Concern (IUCN 3.1)

Scientific classification
- Kingdom: Plantae
- Clade: Tracheophytes
- Clade: Angiosperms
- Clade: Eudicots
- Clade: Asterids
- Order: Lamiales
- Family: Acanthaceae
- Genus: Hypoestes
- Species: H. pubescens

Binomial name
- Hypoestes pubescens Balf.f.

Species of plant

Hypoestes pubescens is a species of plant in the family Acanthaceae. It is endemic to Socotra.
