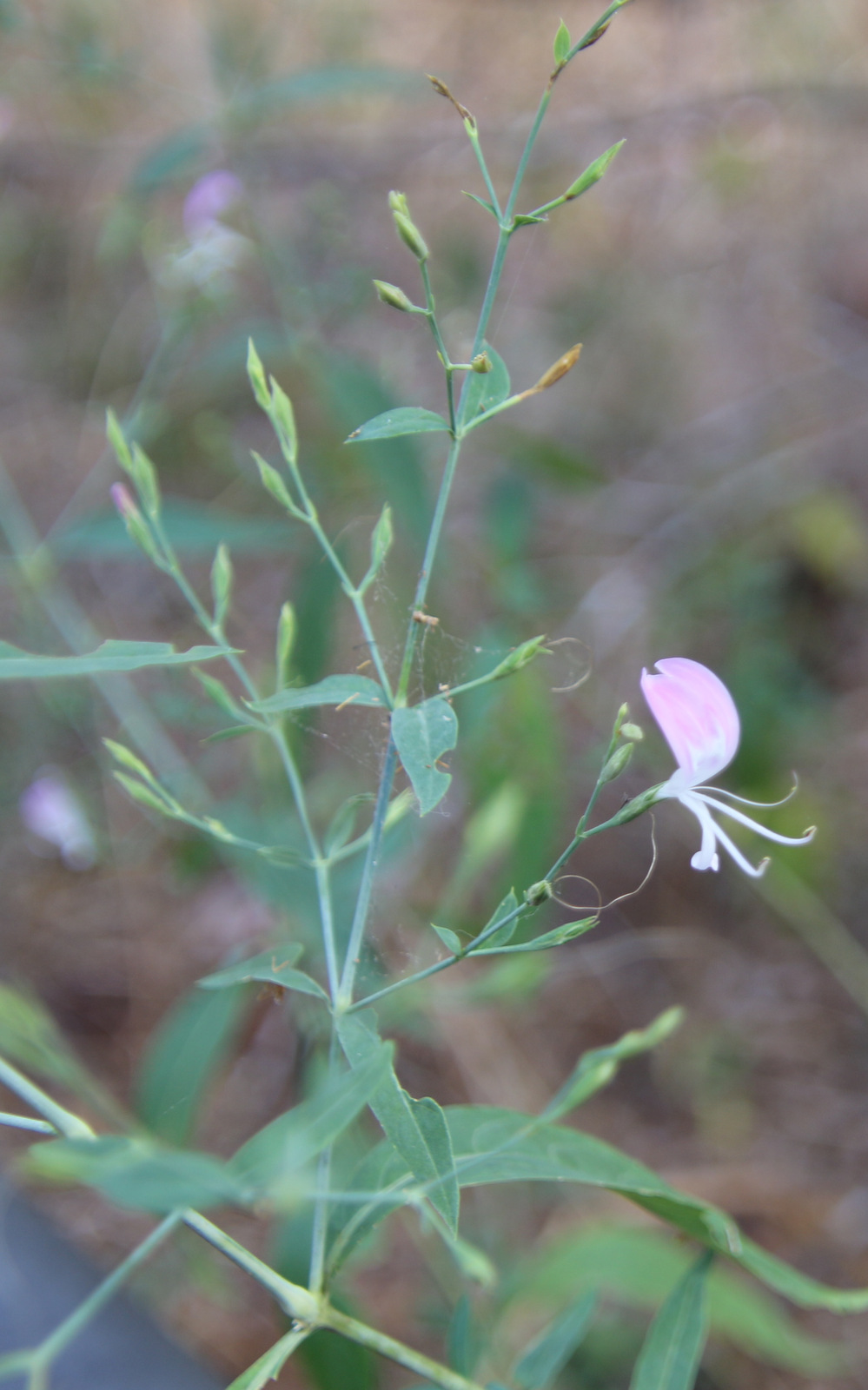
- Litchfield National Park, Australia

Scientific classification
- Kingdom: Plantae
- Clade: Tracheophytes
- Clade: Angiosperms
- Clade: Eudicots
- Clade: Asterids
- Order: Lamiales
- Family: Acanthaceae
- Genus: Hypoestes
- Species: H. floribunda

Binomial name
- Hypoestes floribunda R.Br.

= Hypoestes floribunda =

Species of plant

Hypoestes floribunda is a species of plant in the acanthus family. Growing up to one metre tall, it is found in Australia and islands to the north. This species was one of the many first described by Scottish botanist Robert Brown in his 1810 work Prodromus Florae Novae Hollandiae. Several sub species are recognised.
