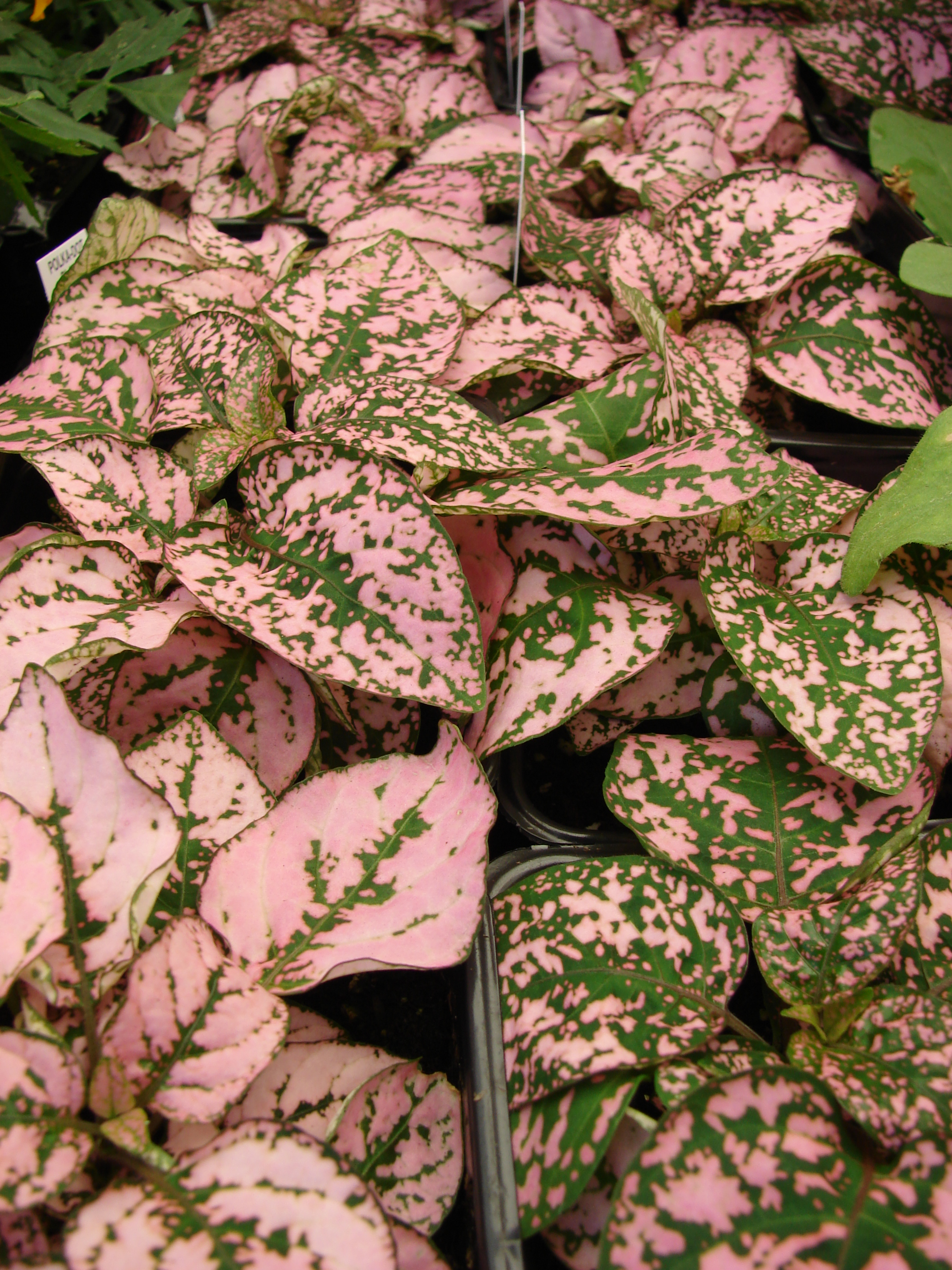
- Polka dot plant

Scientific classification
- Kingdom: Plantae
- Clade: Embryophytes
- Clade: Tracheophytes
- Clade: Angiosperms
- Clade: Eudicots
- Clade: Asterids
- Order: Lamiales
- Family: Acanthaceae
- Subfamily: Acanthoideae
- Tribe: Justicieae
- Genus: Hypoestes; Sol. ex R.Br.

Diversity
- Over 100 species

Synonyms
- Amphiestes S.Moore; Periestes Baill.

= Hypoestes =

Genus of flowering plants

Hypoestes is a flowering plant genus of about 150 species. They are widely distributed throughout the tropical and subtropical lands around the Indian Ocean, and some adjacent regions.

It belongs to the subfamily Acanthoideae of the acanthus family, Acanthaceae. Therein, it is classified in the subtribe Justiciinae of tribe Ruellieae, making it a relative of such American genera as the mosaic plants (Fittonia), water-willows (Justicia) and wrightworts (Carlowrightia).

Hypoestes comes from the Greek 'hypo' meaning under, and 'estia' meaning house. It refers to the way the flowers are hidden by the fused bracts.

Many of these herbaceous to small shrubby plants of the undergrowth have boldly patterned leaves, typically featuring red colors. Some are grown as ornamental plants or pot plants. Most well known among these are H. phyllostachya of Madagascar and its cultivars, commonly called polka dot plant.

== Species ==
Hypoestes species accepted by the Plants of the World Online as of June 2021:

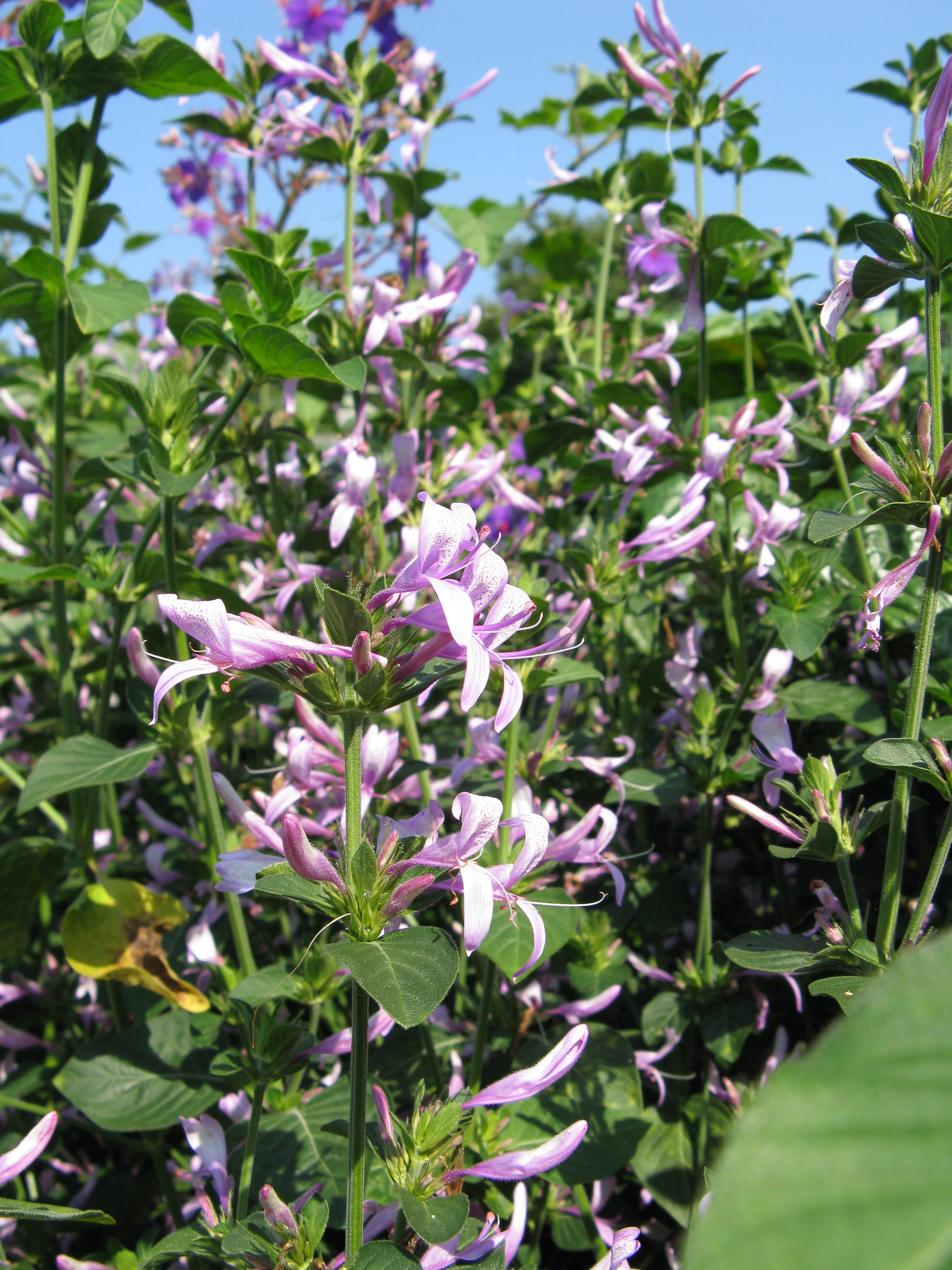
Flowering stalks of Hypoestes aristata

- Hypoestes acuminata Baker
- Hypoestes aldabrensis Baker
- Hypoestes andamanensis Thoth.
- Hypoestes angusta Benoist
- Hypoestes angustilabiata Benoist
- Hypoestes anisophylla Nees
- Hypoestes arachnopus Benoist
- Hypoestes aristata (Vahl) Sol. ex Roem. & Schult.
- Hypoestes bakeri Vatke
- Hypoestes betsiliensis S.Moore
- Hypoestes bojeriana Nees
- Hypoestes bosseri Benoist
- Hypoestes brachiata Baker
- Hypoestes calycina Benoist
- Hypoestes cancellata Nees
- Hypoestes canescens Hedrén & Thulin
- Hypoestes capitata Boivin ex Benoist
- Hypoestes carnosula Chiov.
- Hypoestes catatii Benoist
- Hypoestes caudata Benoist
- Hypoestes celebica Bremek.
- Hypoestes cernua Nees
- Hypoestes chloroclada Baker
- Hypoestes chlorotricha (Bojer ex Nees) Benoist
- Hypoestes cinerascens Benoist
- Hypoestes cochlearia Benoist
- Hypoestes comorensis Baker
- Hypoestes comosa Benoist
- Hypoestes complanata Benoist
- Hypoestes confertiflora Merr.
- Hypoestes congestiflora Baker
- Hypoestes corymbosa Baker
- Hypoestes cruenta Benoist
- Hypoestes cumingiana (Nees) Fern.-Vill.
- Hypoestes decaisneana Nees
- Hypoestes decaryana Benoist
- Hypoestes diclipteroides Nees
- Hypoestes discreta S.Moore
- Hypoestes ecbolioides I.Darbysh.
- Hypoestes egena Benoist
- Hypoestes elegans Nees
- Hypoestes elliotii S.Moore
- Hypoestes erythrostachya Benoist
- Hypoestes fascicularis Nees
- Hypoestes fastuosa (L.) Sol. ex Roem. & Schult.
- Hypoestes flavescens Benoist
- Hypoestes flavovirens Benoist
- Hypoestes flexibilis Nees
- Hypoestes floribunda R.Br.
- Hypoestes forskaolii (Vahl) R.Br.
- Hypoestes glandulifera Scott Elliot
- Hypoestes gracilis Nees
- Hypoestes halconensis Merr.
- Hypoestes hastata Benoist
- Hypoestes hirsuta Nees
- Hypoestes humbertii Benoist
- Hypoestes humifusa Benoist
- Hypoestes incompta Scott Elliot
- Hypoestes inconspicua Balf.f.
- Hypoestes involucrata Roem. & Schult.
- Hypoestes isalensis Benoist
- Hypoestes jasminoides Baker
- Hypoestes juanensis Benoist
- Hypoestes kjellbergii Bremek.
- Hypoestes kuntzei C.B.Clarke ex Ridl.
- Hypoestes laeta Benoist
- Hypoestes lanata Dalzell
- Hypoestes larsenii Bremek.
- Hypoestes lasioclada Nees
- Hypoestes lasiostegia Nees
- Hypoestes leptostegia S.Moore
- Hypoestes longilabiata Scott Elliot
- Hypoestes longispica Benoist
- Hypoestes longituba Benoist
- Hypoestes loniceroides Baker
- Hypoestes macilenta Benoist
- Hypoestes maculosa Nees
- Hypoestes malaccensis Wight
- Hypoestes mangokiensis Benoist
- Hypoestes merrillii C.B.Clarke ex Elmer
- Hypoestes mindorensis Merr.
- Hypoestes mollior C.B.Clarke ex S.Moore
- Hypoestes mollissima (Vahl) Nees
- Hypoestes multispicata Benoist
- Hypoestes nummulariifolia Baker
- Hypoestes obtusifolia Baker
- Hypoestes oppositiflora Benoist
- Hypoestes oxystegia Nees
- Hypoestes palawanensis C.B.Clarke
- Hypoestes parvula Benoist
- Hypoestes perrieri Benoist
- Hypoestes phyllostachya Baker
- Hypoestes poilanei Benoist
- Hypoestes poissonii Benoist
- Hypoestes polythyrsa Miq.
- Hypoestes populifolia Miq.
- Hypoestes potamophila Heine
- Hypoestes psilochlamys Bremek.
- Hypoestes pubescens Balf.f.
- Hypoestes pubiflora T.Anderson ex R.Baron
- Hypoestes pulchra Nees
- Hypoestes purpurea (L.) R.Br.
- Hypoestes radicans Deflers
- Hypoestes richardii Nees
- Hypoestes rodriguesiana Balf.f.
- Hypoestes rosea P.Beauv.
- Hypoestes saboureaui Benoist
- Hypoestes salajeriana Bremek.
- Hypoestes salensis Benoist
- Hypoestes saxicola Nees
- Hypoestes scoparia Benoist
- Hypoestes serpens (Vahl) R.Br.
- Hypoestes sessilifolia Baker
- Hypoestes setigera Benoist
- Hypoestes sparsiflora R.M.Barker
- Hypoestes spicata Nees
- Hypoestes stachyoides Baker
- Hypoestes stenoptera Benoist
- Hypoestes strobilifera S.Moore
- Hypoestes subcapitata C.B.Clarke
- Hypoestes taeniata Benoist
- Hypoestes tenuifolia Ridl.
- Hypoestes tenuis Merr.
- Hypoestes tetraptera Benoist
- Hypoestes teucrioides Nees
- Hypoestes teysmanniana Miq.
- Hypoestes thomsoniana Nees
- Hypoestes thothathrii Vasudeva Rao & Chakrab.
- Hypoestes transversa Benoist
- Hypoestes trichochlamys Baker
- Hypoestes triflora (Forssk.) Roem. & Schult.
- Hypoestes tubiflora Benoist
- Hypoestes unilateralis Baker
- Hypoestes urophora Benoist
- Hypoestes vagabunda Benoist
- Hypoestes vidalii C.B.Clarke
- Hypoestes viguieri Benoist
- Hypoestes warpurioides Benoist
