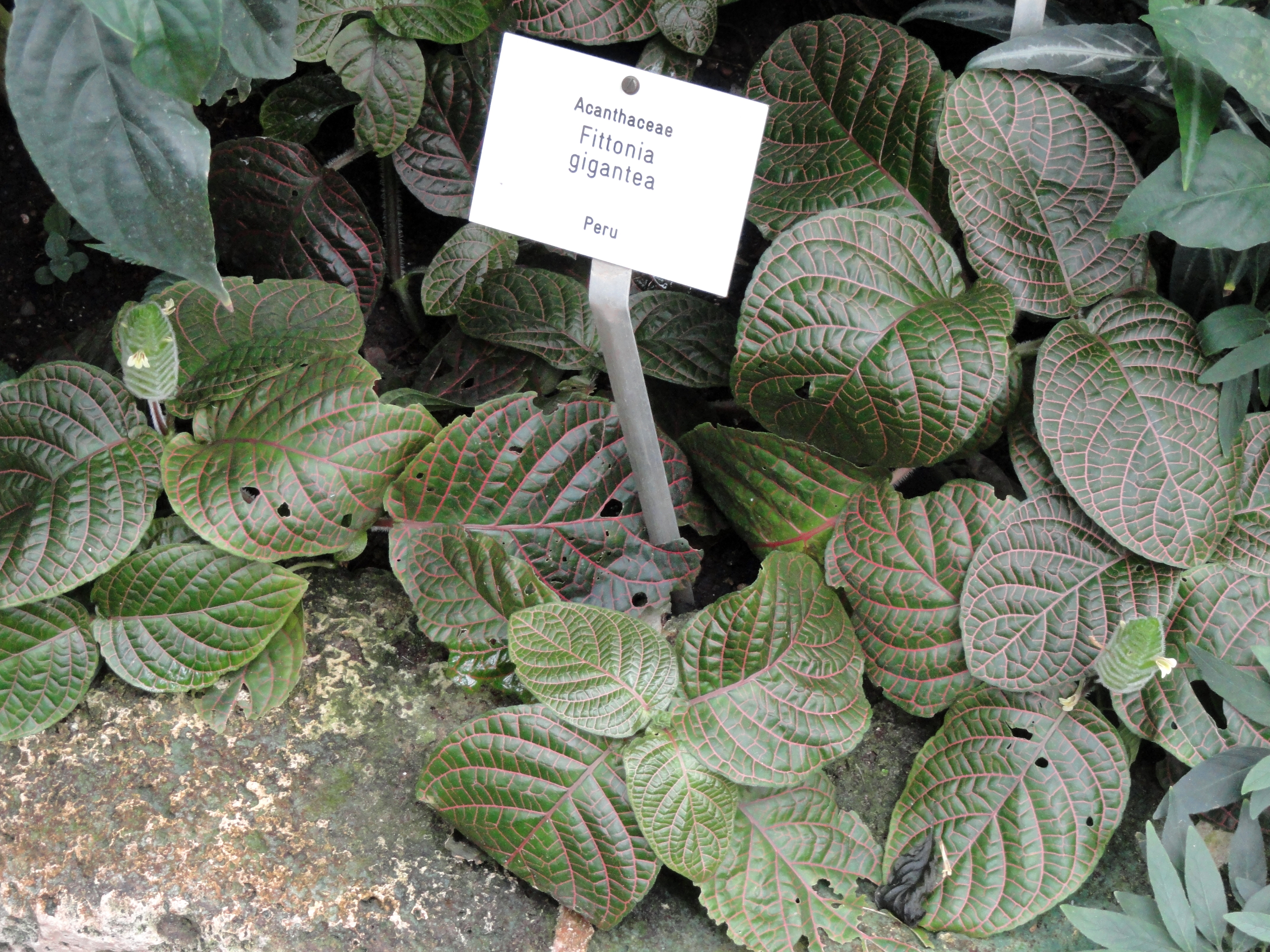

Scientific classification
- Kingdom: Plantae
- Clade: Tracheophytes
- Clade: Angiosperms
- Clade: Eudicots
- Clade: Asterids
- Order: Lamiales
- Family: Acanthaceae
- Genus: Fittonia
- Species: F. gigantea

Binomial name
- Fittonia gigantea Linden

Synonyms
- Gymnostachyum giganteum Hort. ex L. H. Bailey

= Fittonia gigantea =

Species of plant

Fittonia gigantea is a species of flowering plant in the family Acanthaceae. It is native to tropical rainforest in Ecuador and Peru.

== Characteristics ==
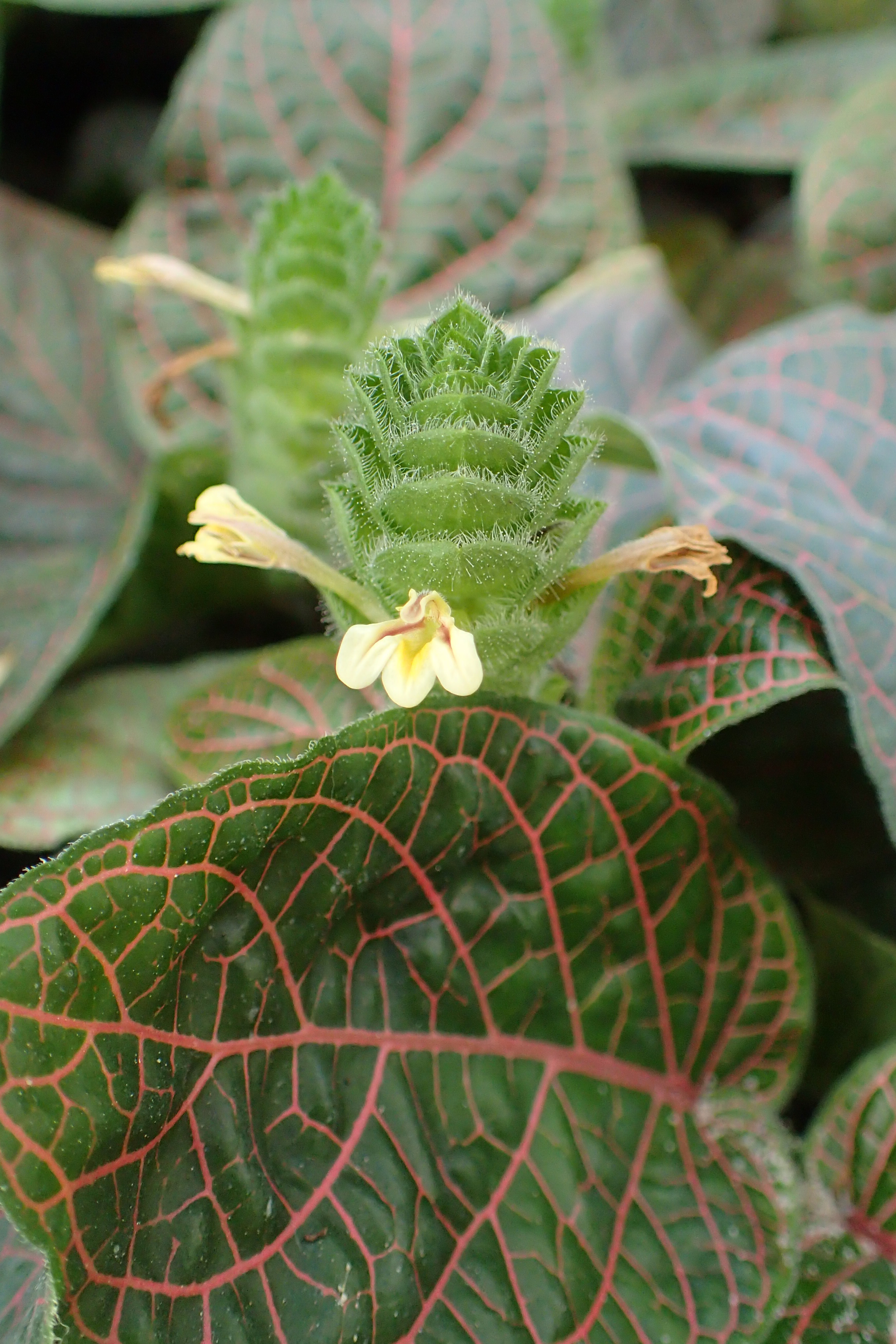
Leaves and flowers

The perennials reach heights of 60 to 80 centimetres. Fittonia gigantea is evergreen. The simple leaves are opposite, ovate, entire and petiolate, with red veins. Spikes of cream-colored labiate flowers are followed by loculicidal capsules.
