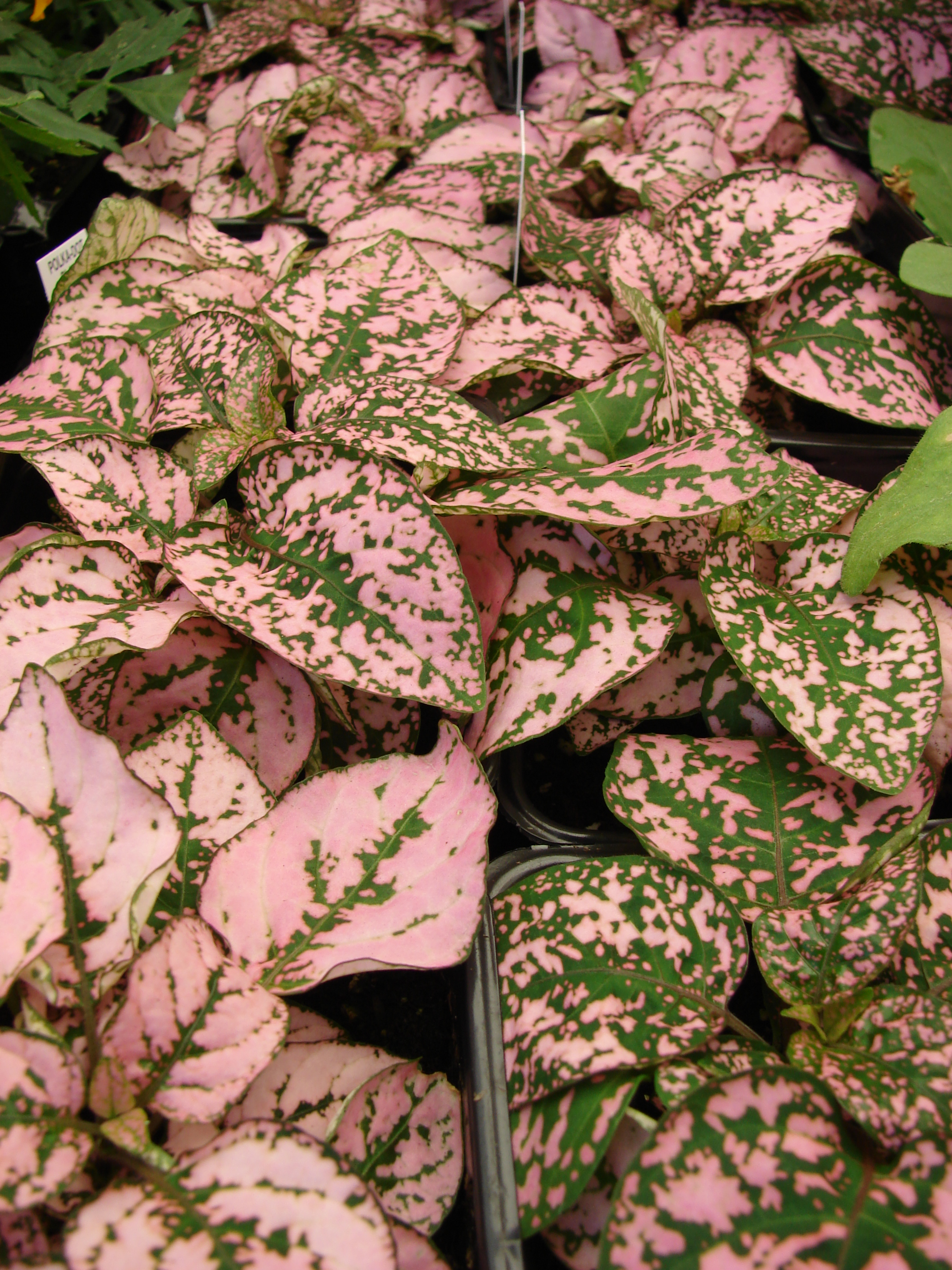

Scientific classification
- Kingdom: Plantae
- Clade: Tracheophytes
- Clade: Angiosperms
- Clade: Eudicots
- Clade: Asterids
- Order: Lamiales
- Family: Acanthaceae
- Genus: Hypoestes
- Species: H. phyllostachya

Binomial name
- Hypoestes phyllostachya Baker, 1887

= Hypoestes phyllostachya =

Species of flowering plant

Hypoestes phyllostachya, the polka dot plant, is a species of flowering plant in the family Acanthaceae, native to South Africa, Madagascar, and south east Asia. The spots often merge into larger areas of colour.

The genus name Hypoestes comes from the Greek hypo, meaning "under", and estia meaning "a house"; this refers to the calyxes being covered by bracts. The Latin specific epithet phyllostachya means "with a leaf spike".

== Description ==
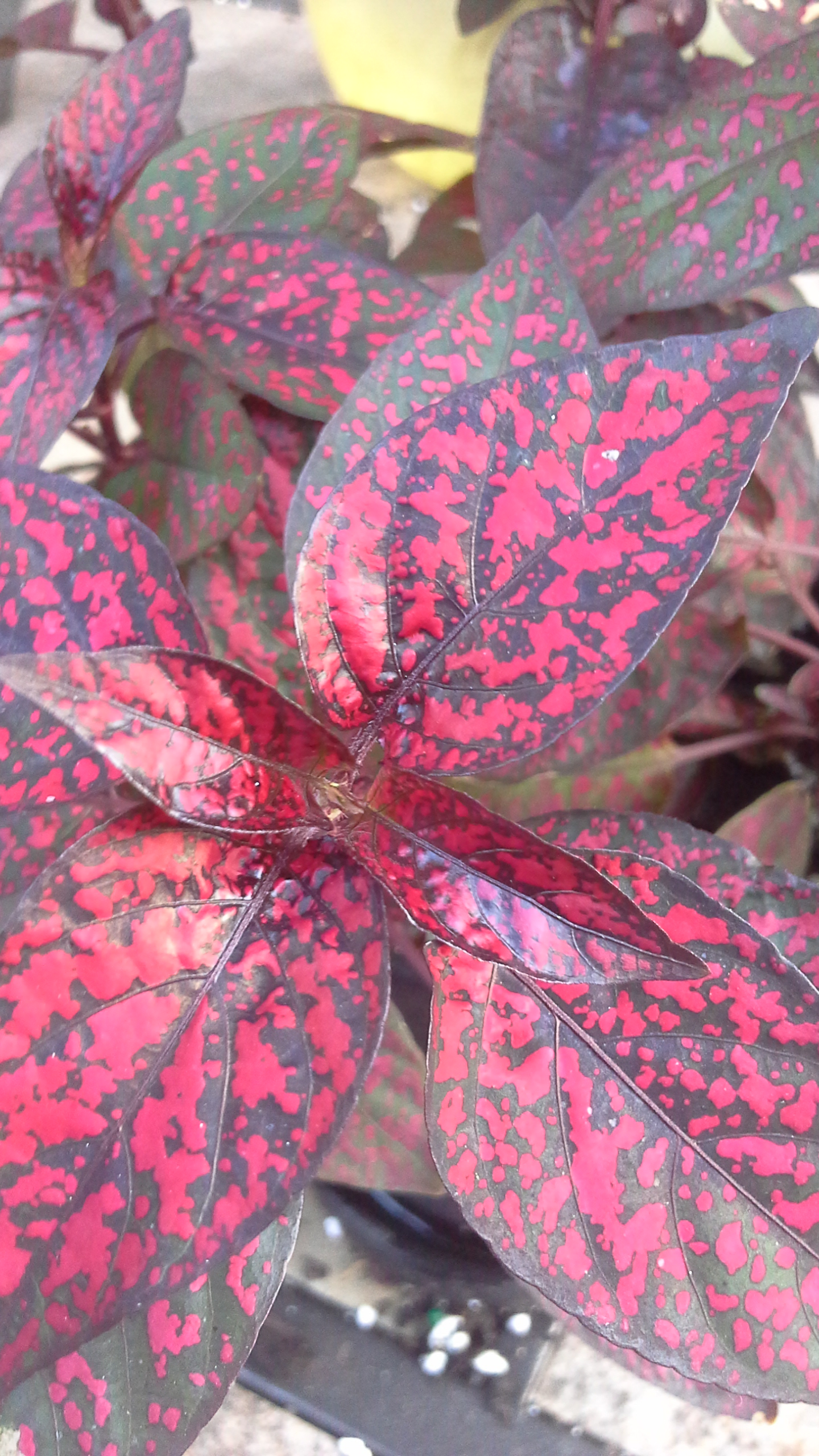
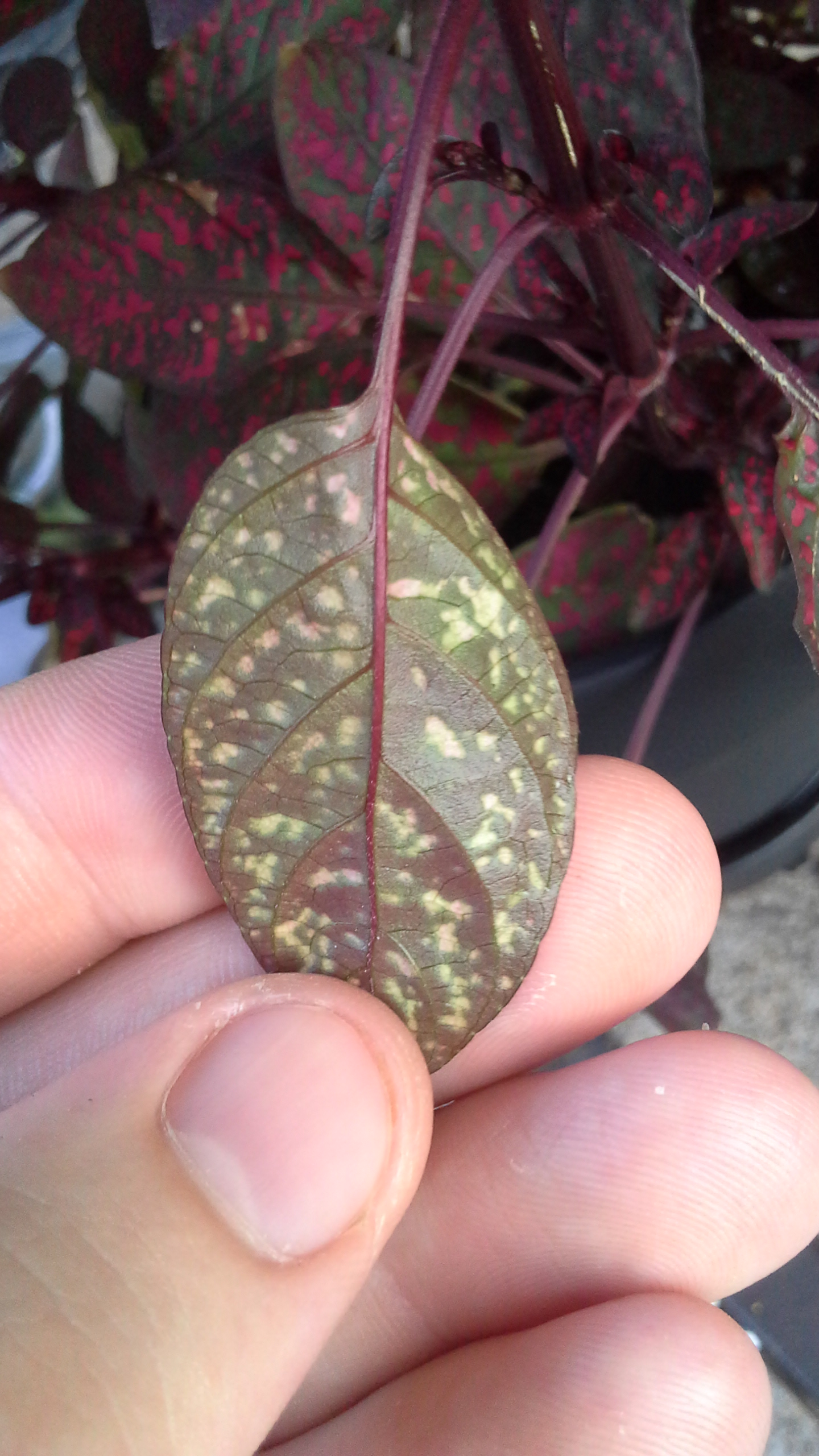
A dark red variety and its much lighter underside

Growing to 30 cm (12 in) tall and broad, it is an evergreen shrub with leaves heavily-spotted pink or white, as if sprayed with paint. This small shrub with green foliage stained with pink-purple dots forms bushy and compact tufts. The leaves are opposite, oval and pointed. They are borne by petioles of 2 to 4 cm 1. The most common type has green leaves with pink spots, although it can range from white to any shade of pink to red. The spots on the undersides of the leaves are far lighter in color, often white.

It may produce small, solitary pink/purple flowers at the nodes that resemble honeysuckle. The small flowers form on the cob at the end of the stems and are pink/purple. The fruit is a many-seeded dehiscent capsule.

== Cultivation ==
Hypoestes phyllostachya is cultivated as an ornamental plant and is familiar as a houseplant, but can also be grown outside as an annual plant in cooler climates or a perennial in the subtropics and tropics. In the UK it has gained the Royal Horticultural Society's Award of Garden Merit. Many different cultivars have been created with different foliage colors.

This plant does best in partial sun. In the United States, it is winter hardy in zones 10 and 11. It has low drought tolerance, but is rarely damaged by deer. It spreads by cuttings and seedlings.

=== Cultivars ===
Hypoestes phyllostachya has a multitude of cultivars whose leaves are green, white or red (from pink to carmine), punctuated, stained or streaked with green, white or red among which can be mentioned :

- H. phyllostachya 'Camina' with dark green leaves and carmine red
- H. phyllostachya 'Confetti Blush', white veined olive green
- H. phyllostachya 'Pink Splash', green and pale pink
- H. phyllostachya 'Red Splash', green and red
- H. phyllostachya 'White Splash', green and white

== Gallery ==
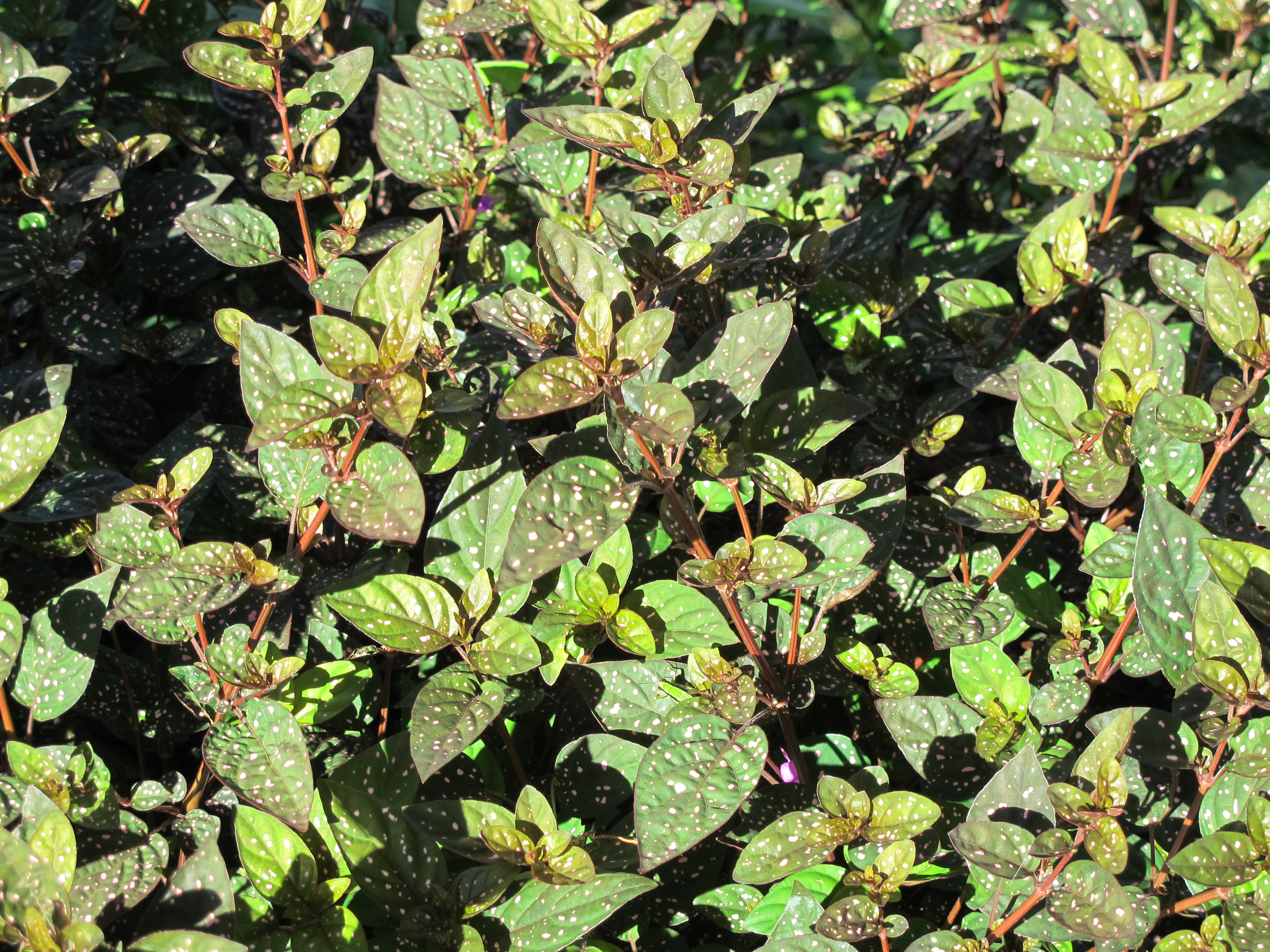
In Madagascar

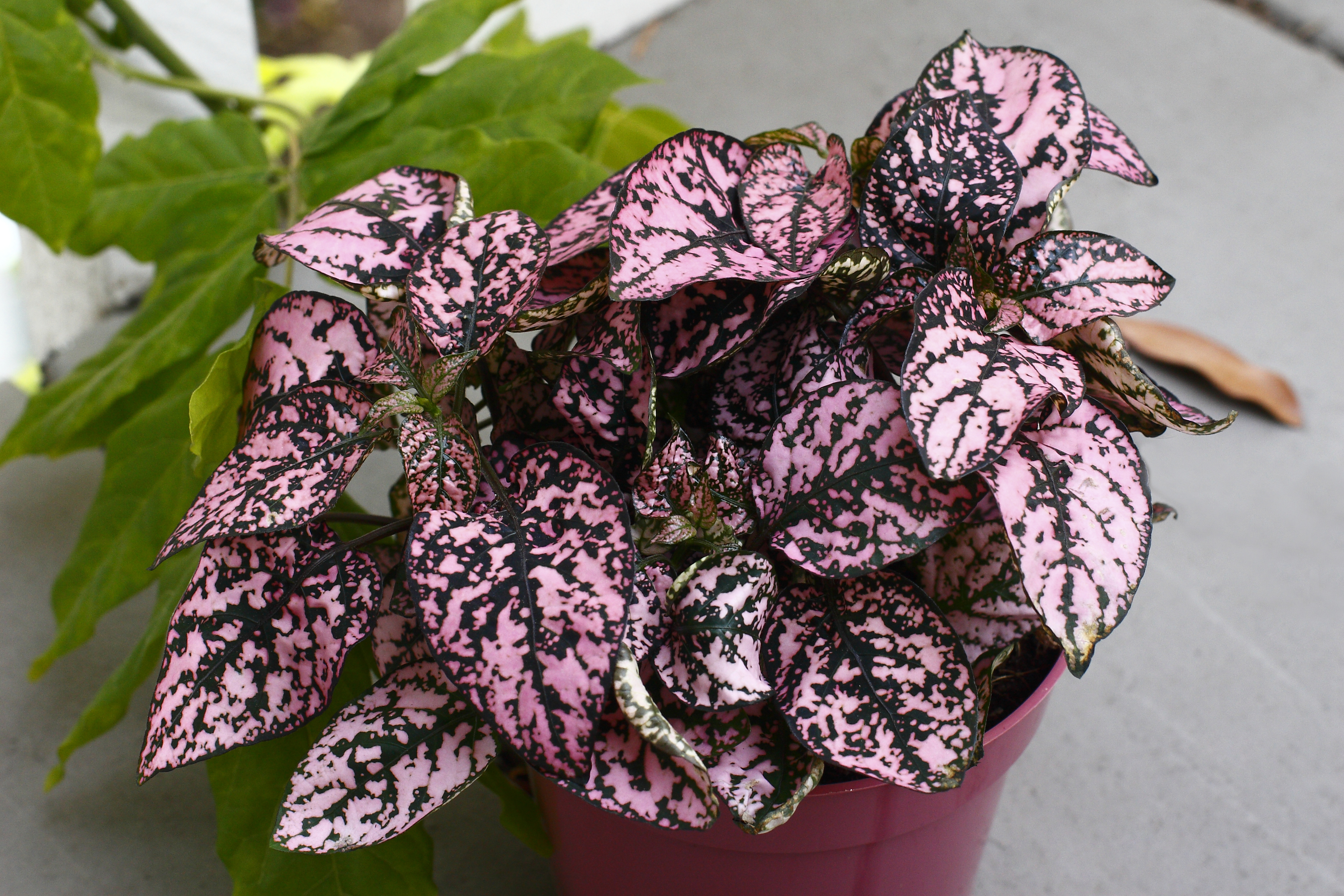
Glossy pink and dark green blobs

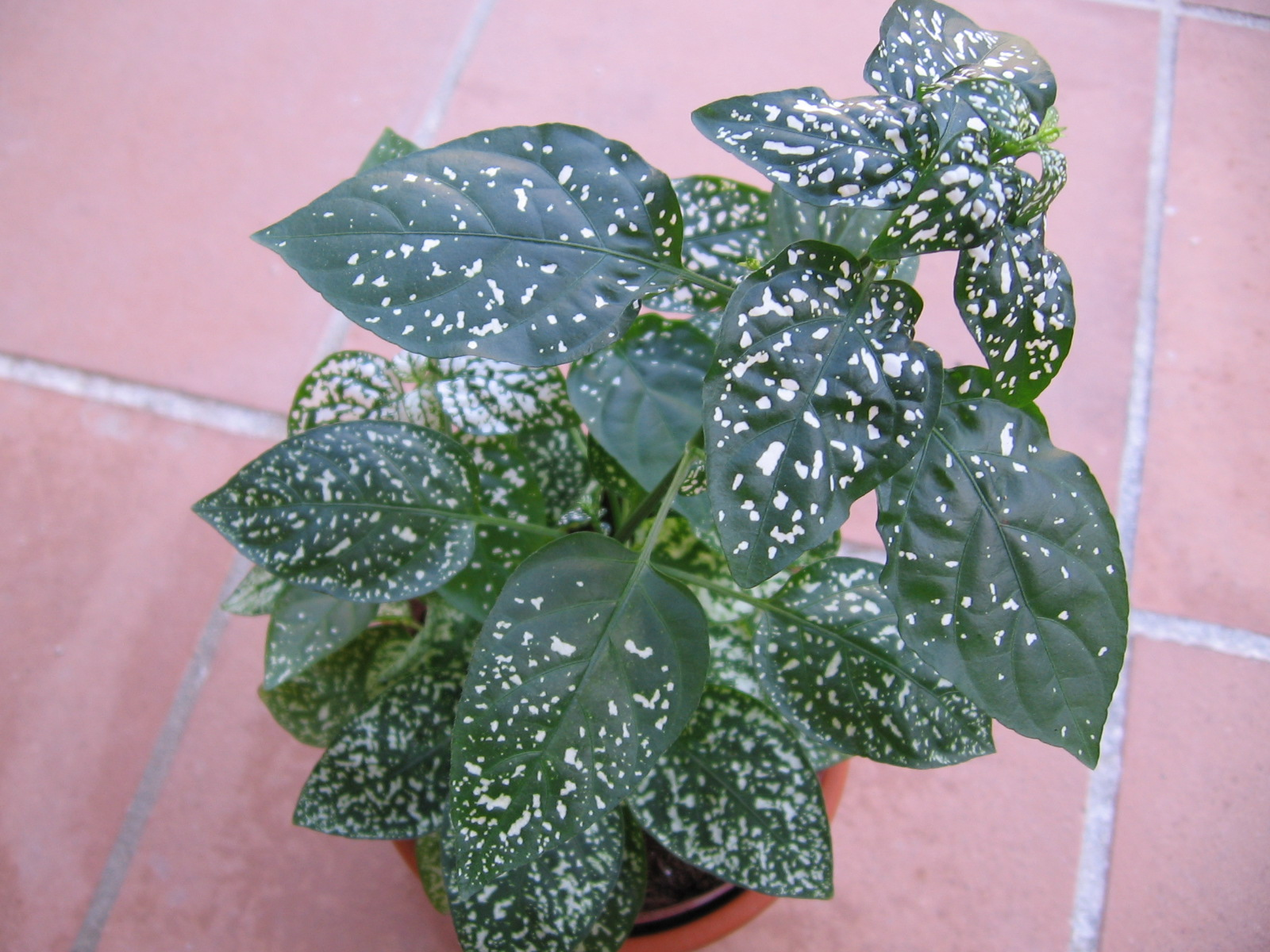
With white dots

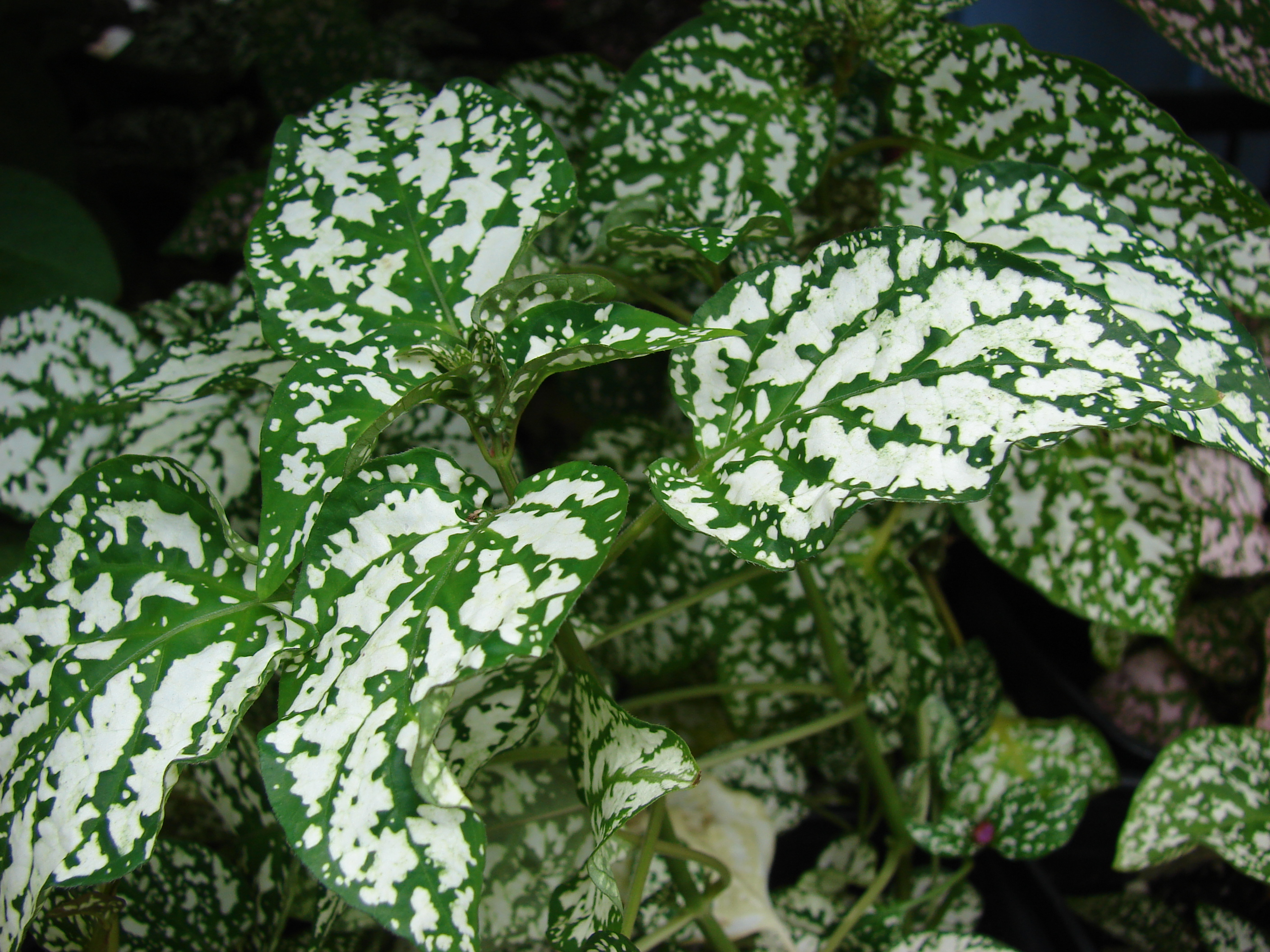
Large white dots

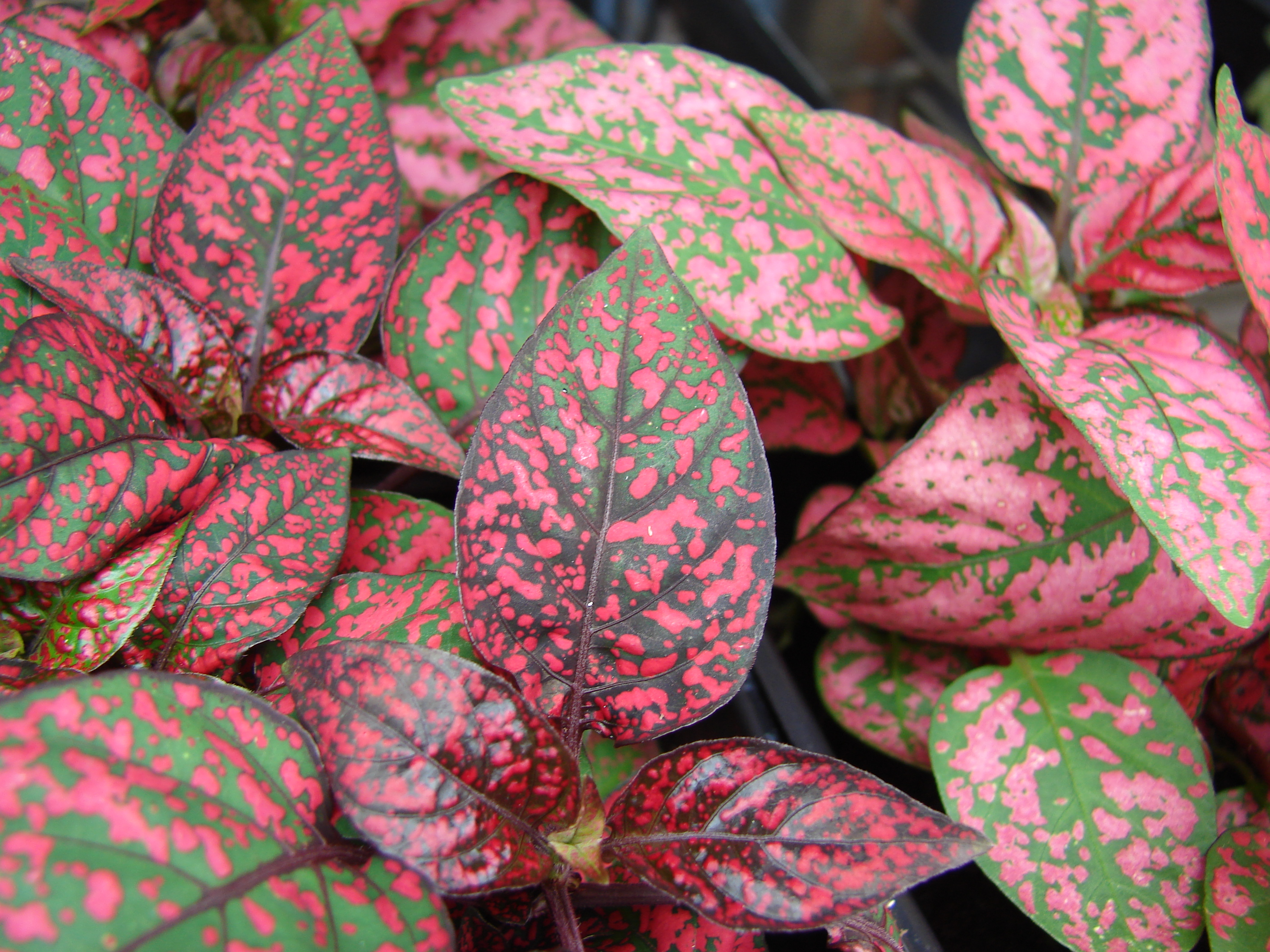
Leaves with pink marks

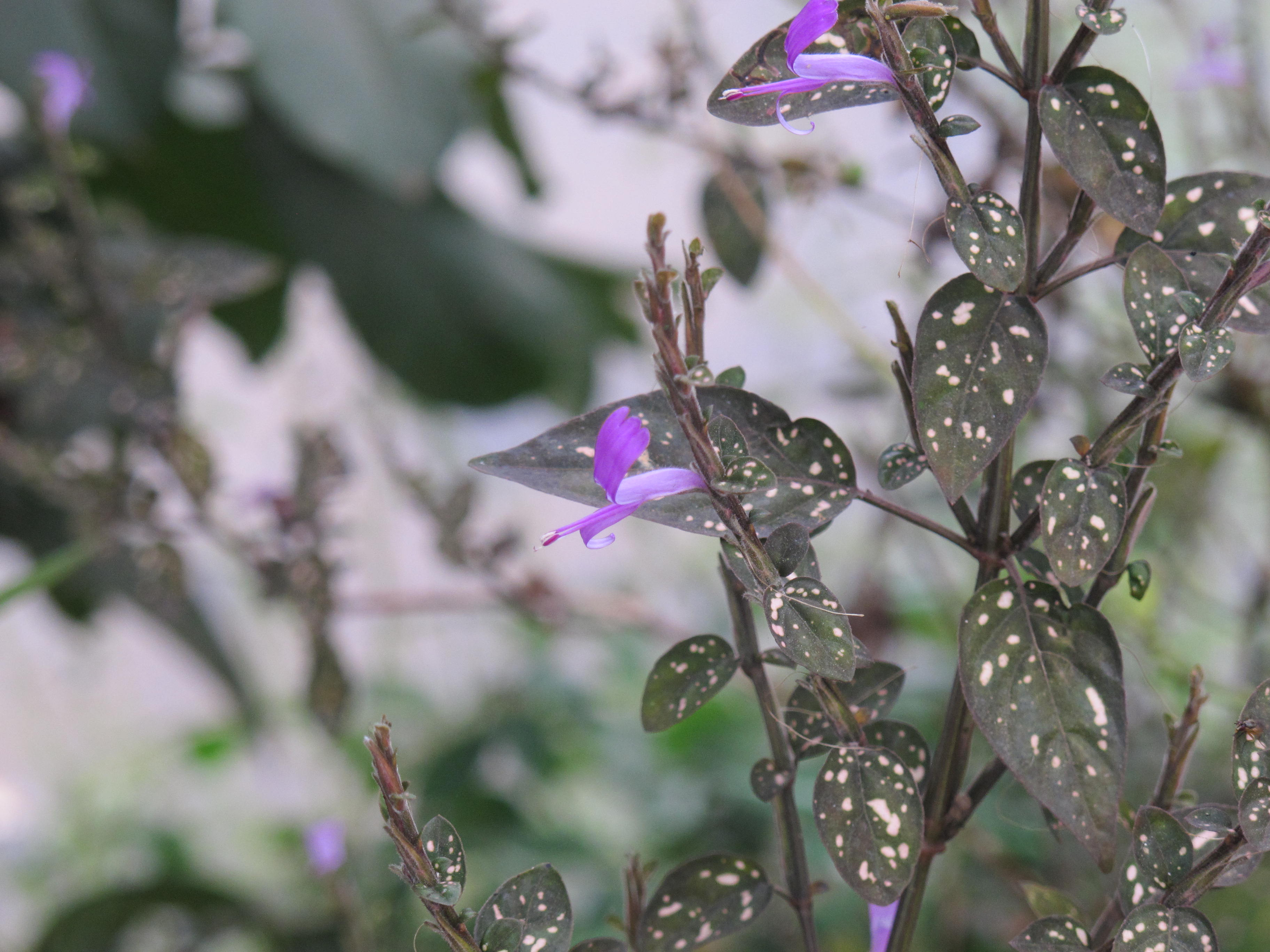
Purple flower

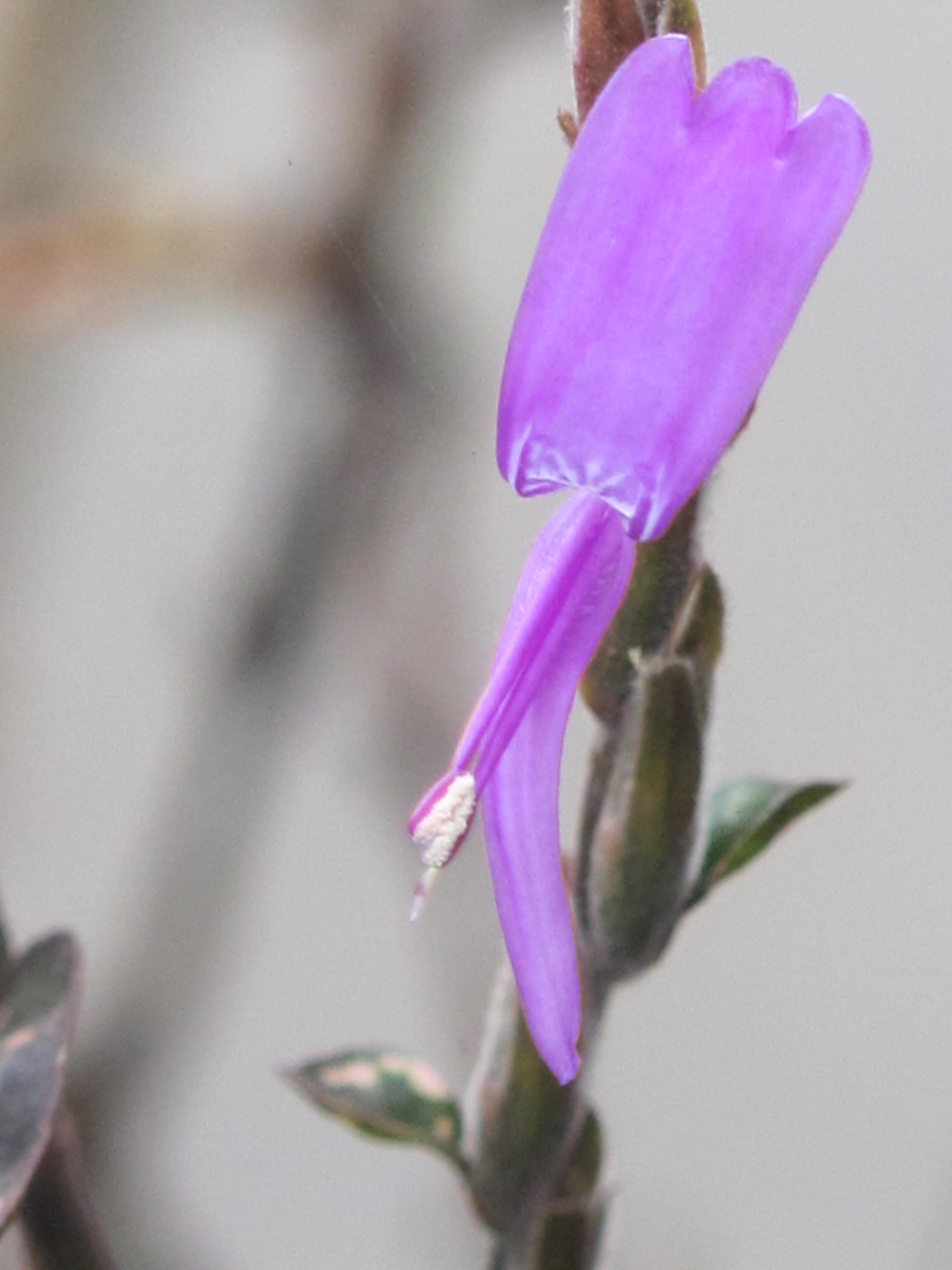
Closeup flower
