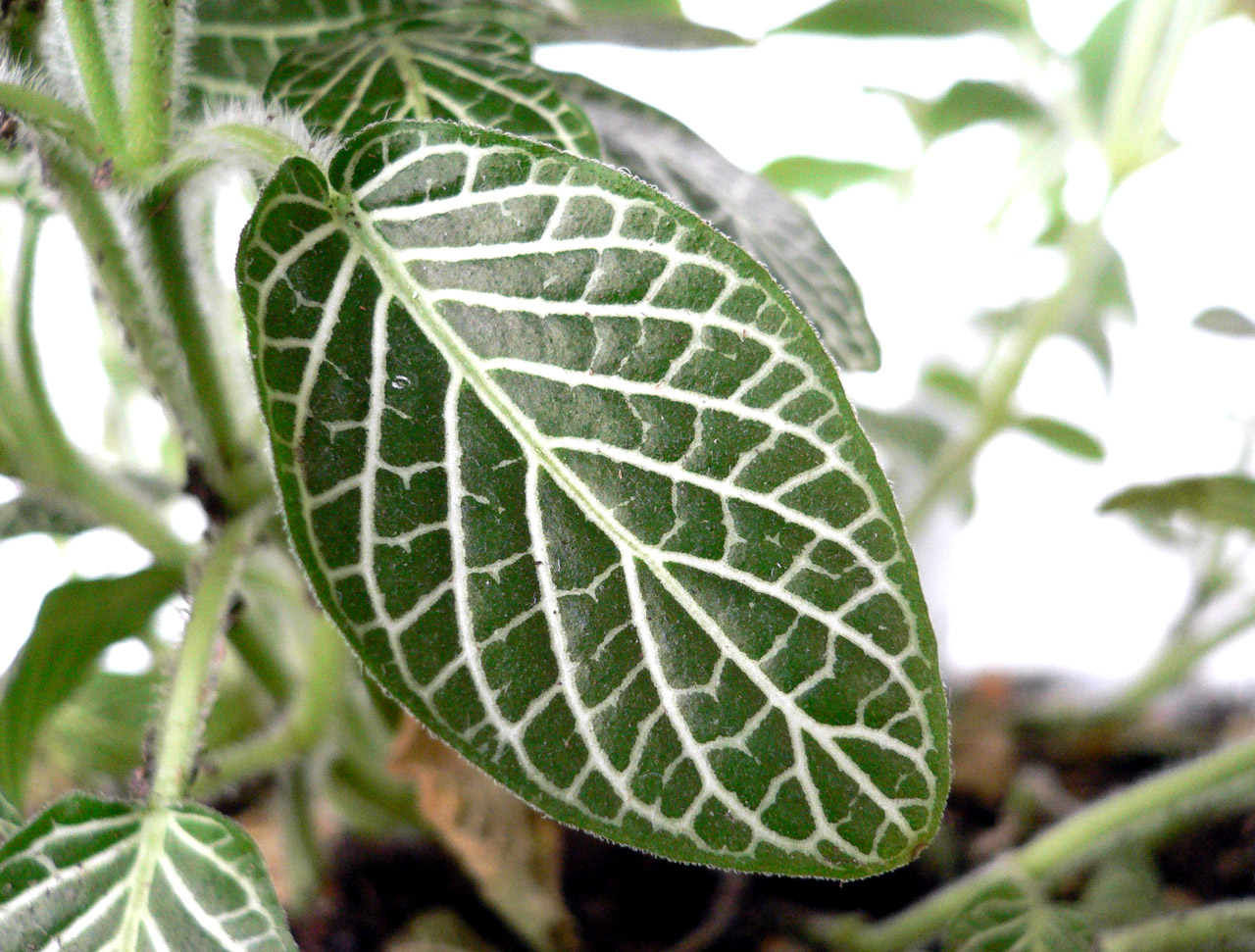
- Fittonia albivenis
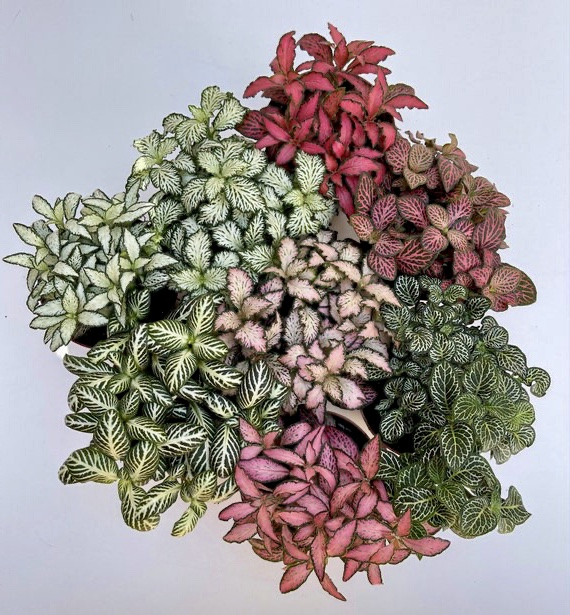
- A variety of Fittonia hybrids.

Scientific classification
- Kingdom: Plantae
- Clade: Embryophytes
- Clade: Tracheophytes
- Clade: Spermatophytes
- Clade: Angiosperms
- Clade: Eudicots
- Clade: Asterids
- Order: Lamiales
- Family: Acanthaceae
- Subfamily: Acanthoideae
- Tribe: Justicieae
- Genus: Fittonia; Coem.

Synonyms
- Adelaster Lindl. ex Veitch

= Fittonia =

Genus of flowering plants

Fittonia (or nerve plant or mosaic plant) is a genus of evergreen perennial flowering plants in the acanthus ('bear’s britches') family, Acanthaceae. The genus is native to tropical and subtropical forested areas in northern and western South America, mainly Peru.

The most commonly cultivated species is F. albivenis and its range of cultivars. They are low-lying, forest floor plants, typically only growing between 10–15 cm (4–6 in) tall, without the 5-10 cm (1-4 in) tall flower stalks. The main feature of the species is its lush, green foliage, streaked with veins of white to deep pink, depending on cultivar; this veining earns the plant its common name of 'Nerve-Plant', as the "network" of vessels appears to resemble the layout of a nervous system. The plants also possess a short fuzz on their stems, like other acanthus family genera. Small buds may appear after a time where the stem splits into leaves.

With a spreading growth habit making it ideal as a shaded garden groundcover, Fittonia can easily be propagated by taking cuttings or by pruning the growing tips. These fresh clippings will regrow roots simply by placing the cut ends in a vessel of water in a bright, albeit indirectly-lit, location. Optionally, this method of "water-propagation" may be avoided altogether, as most cuttings may be placed directly into moist substrate, such as sphagnum moss, perlite, coconut (coco) fiber, well-aerated soil, or even LECA (hydroton clay balls). As most plant species will do after being pruned, the trimmed section(s) of the mother plant will be triggered to grow new leaves in a matter of weeks.

The flowers are rather small, appearing on angular-sided bloom spikes, with a white to off-white colour. Fittonia inflorescences are quite reminiscent of those of the related genus Hypoestes (polka-dot plants); additionally, like the Hypoestes, Fittonia are best kept in a moist area with mild, indirect but bright sunlight, or under screening outdoors in appropriate climates. They thrive in ambient temperatures above 55 °F (13 °C), thus, in temperate areas, they must be grown as houseplants. Notoriously thirsty plants, Fittonia (and Hypoestes) are known to "faint" or wilt when the top layer of substrate begins to dry, but is quickly revived with watering. The plants respond especially well to "bottom watering", or by submerging a potted specimen in a tray of water instead of pouring water from above. This has the added benefit of keeping the leaves free of water droplets or splashed dirt, which could both lead to fungal infections, such as powdery mildew.

== Species ==
- Fittonia albivenis
- Fittonia gigantea
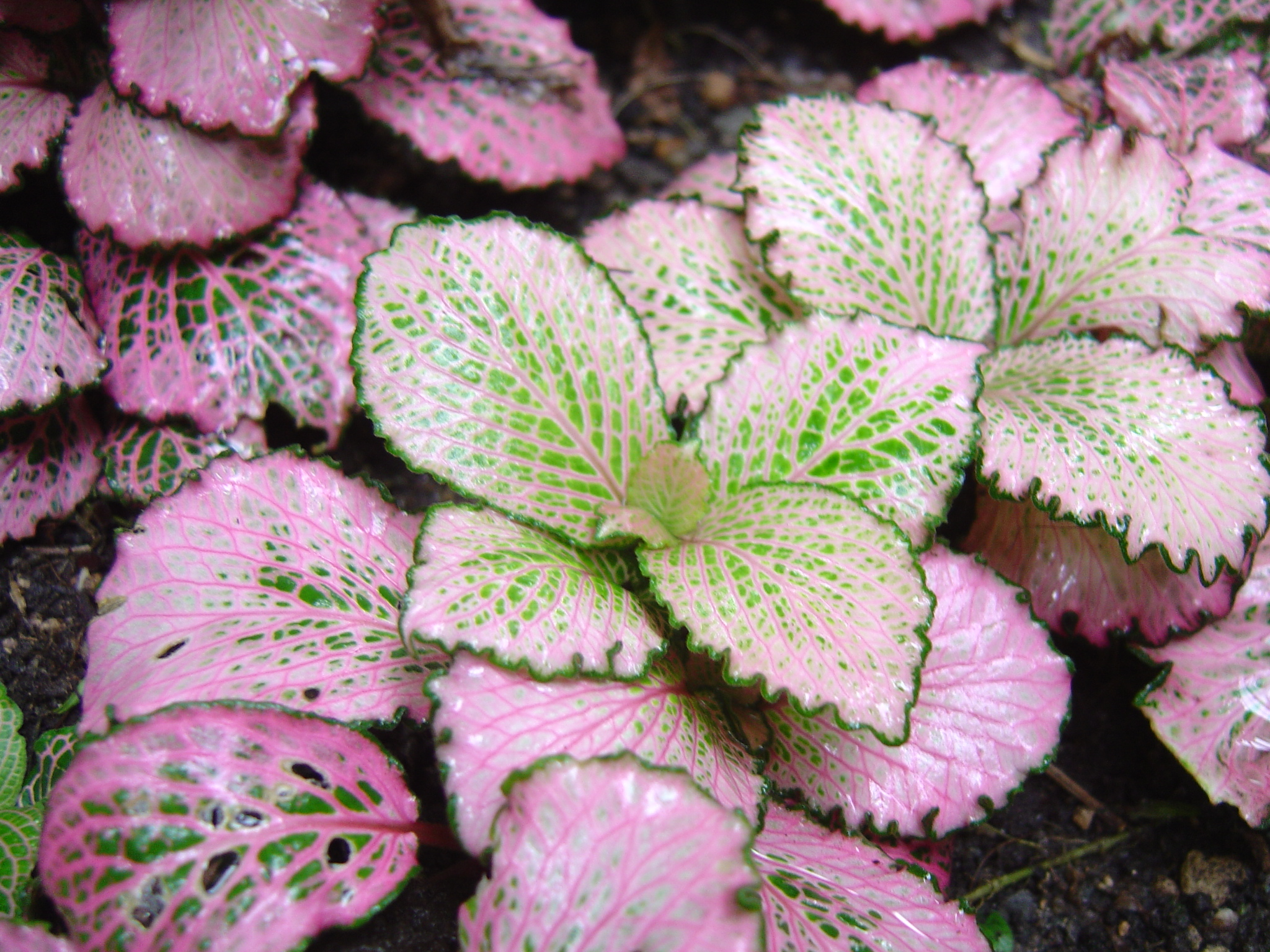
Fittonia albivenis

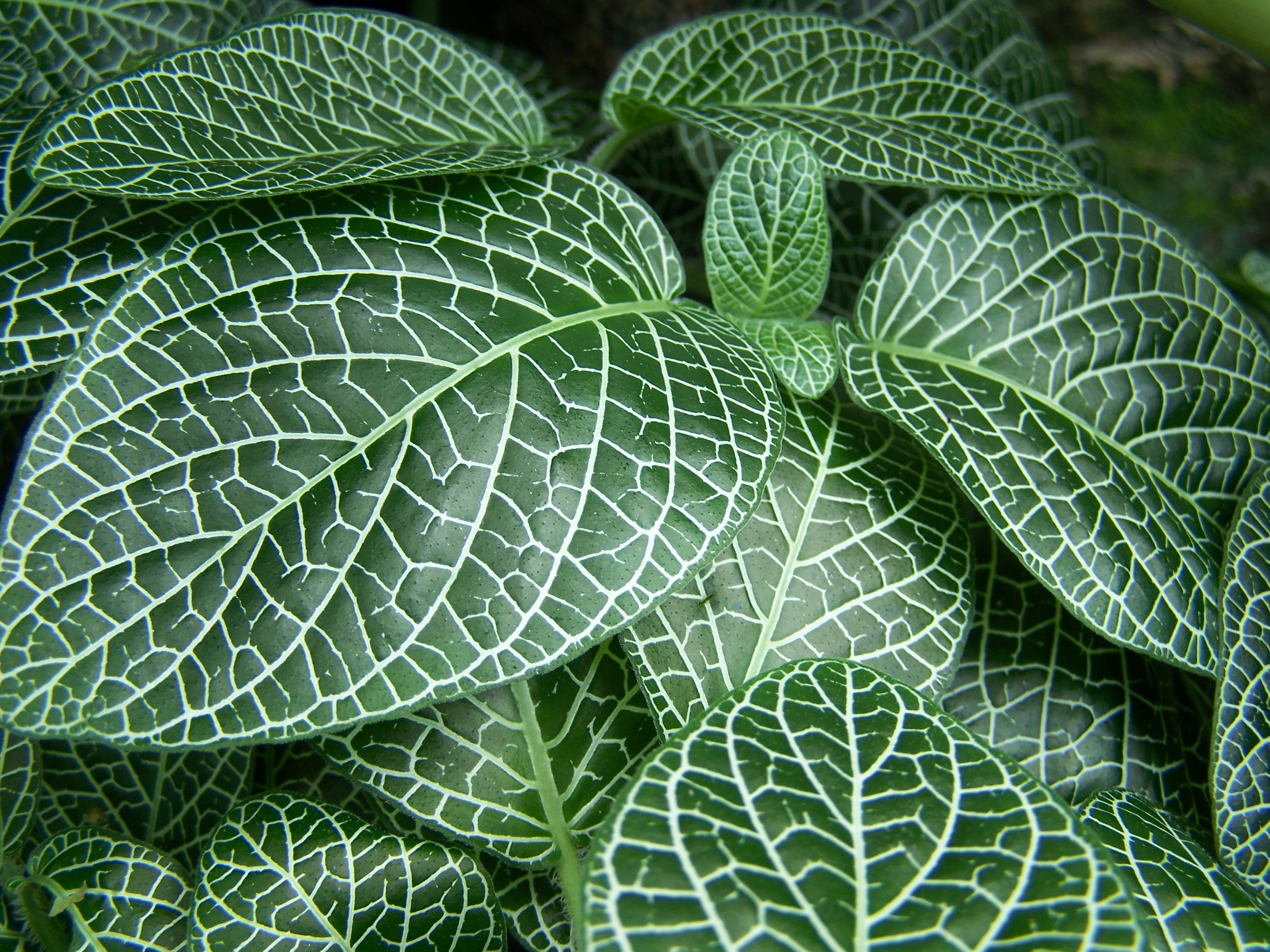

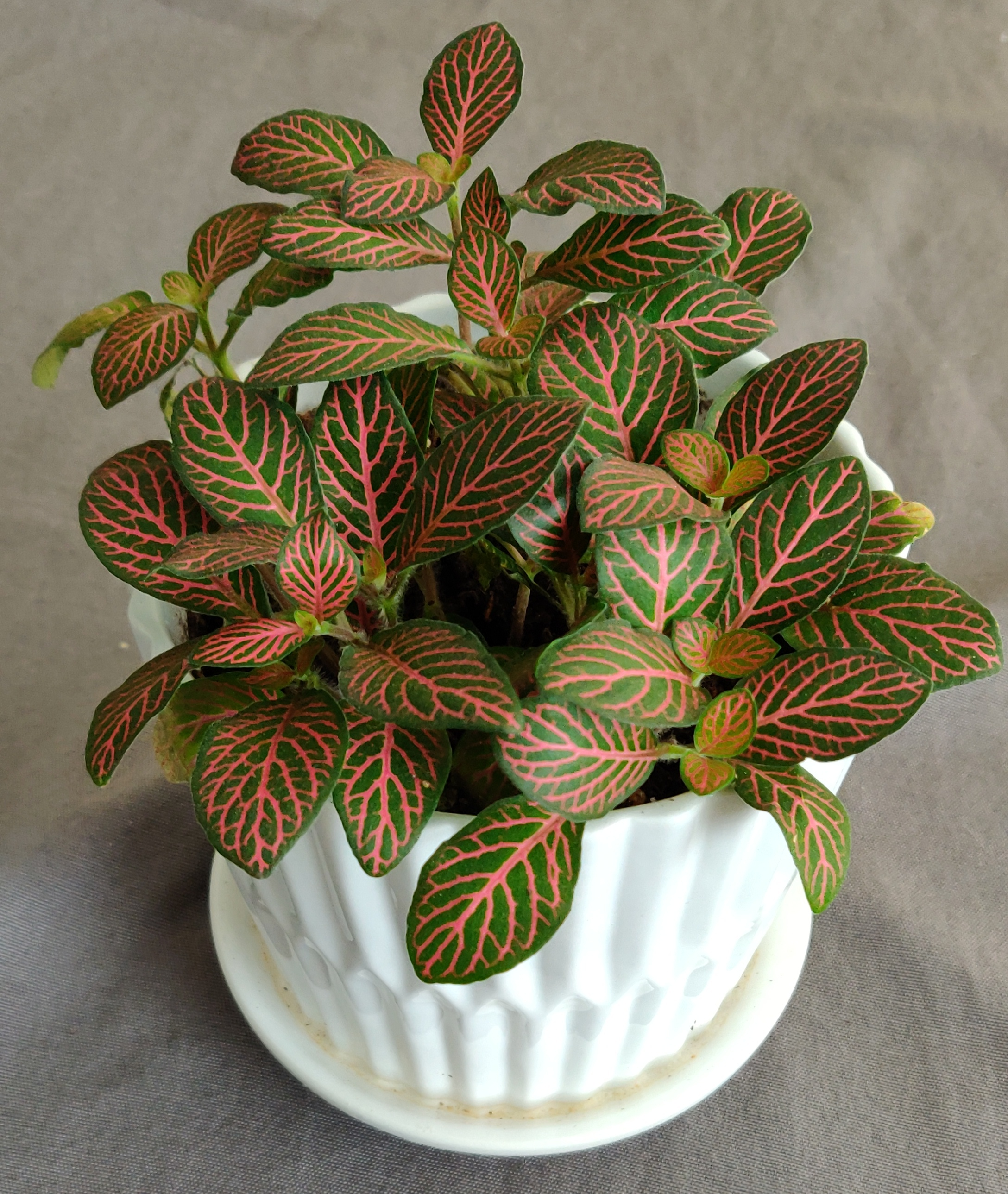
Red-nerved Fittonia 'Mini Red'.

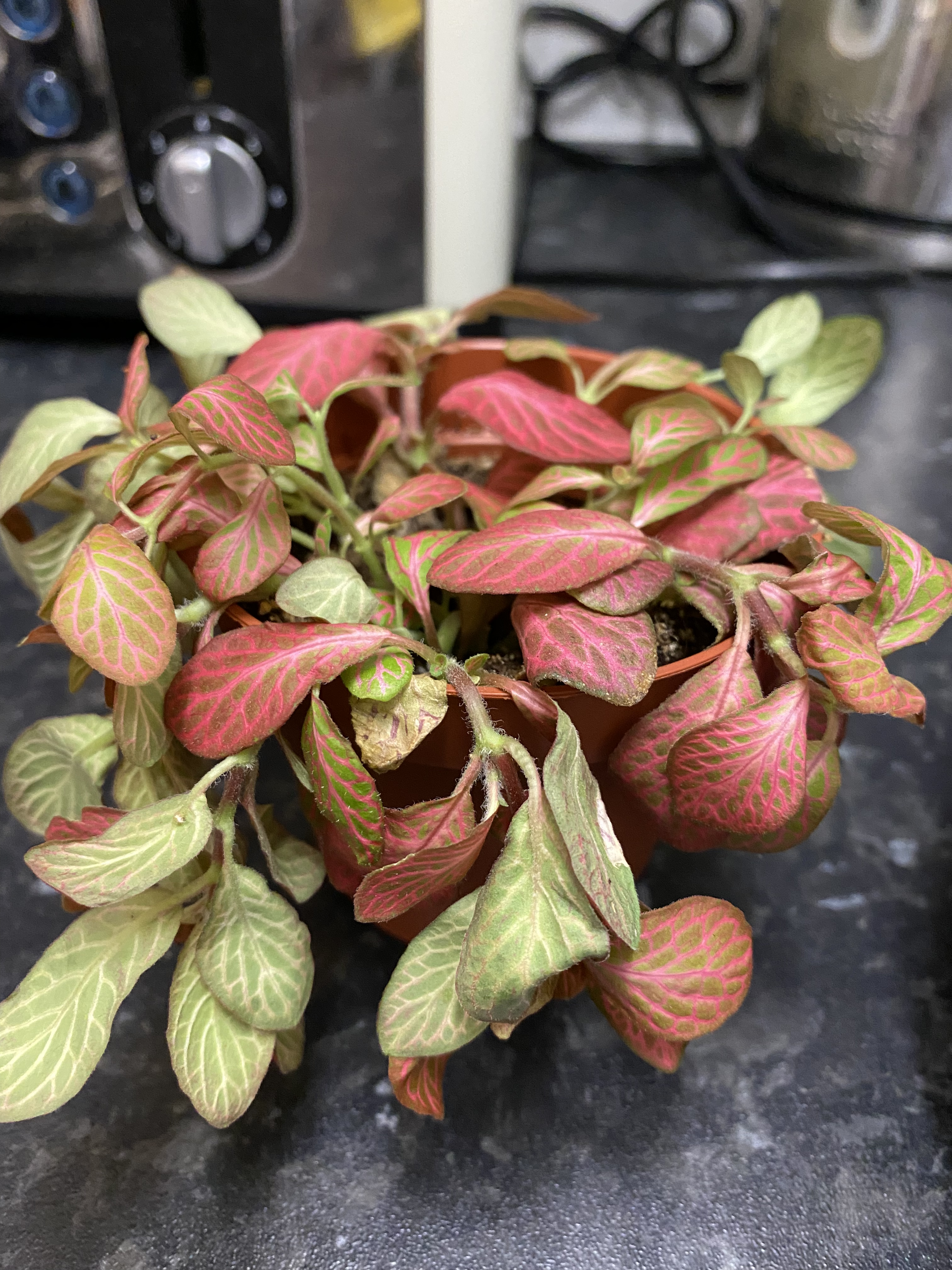
A wilting, thirsty plant.
