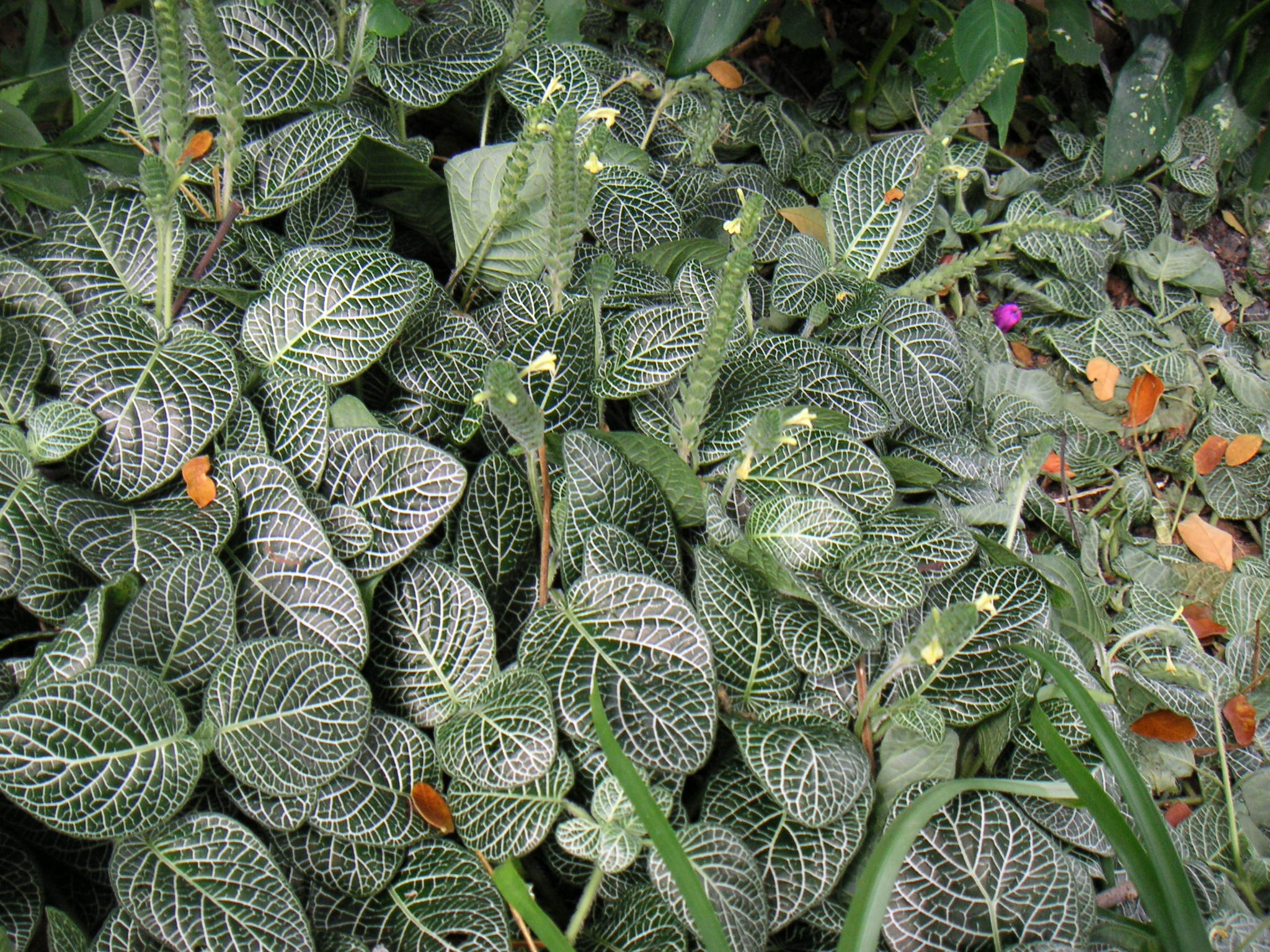

Scientific classification
- Kingdom: Plantae
- Clade: Tracheophytes
- Clade: Angiosperms
- Clade: Eudicots
- Clade: Asterids
- Order: Lamiales
- Family: Acanthaceae
- Genus: Fittonia
- Species: F. albivenis

Binomial name
- Fittonia albivenis (Lindl. ex Veitch) Brummitt

Synonyms
- Adelaster albivenis Lindl. ex Veitch (basionym); Fittonia argyroneura Coem.; Fittonia verschaffeltii (Lem.) Van Houtte; Fittonia verschaffeltii var. argyroneura (Coem.) Regel; Gymnostachyum verschaffeltii Lem.

= Fittonia albivenis =

Species of plant

Fittonia albivenis is a species of flowering plant in the family Acanthaceae, native to the rainforests of Colombia, Peru, Bolivia, Ecuador and northern Brazil. An evergreen perennial, it is notable for its dark green foliage with strongly contrasting white or red veins. It is commonly called nerve plant or mosaic plant. In temperate regions where the temperature falls below 10 °C (50 °F) it must be grown as a houseplant.

== Description ==
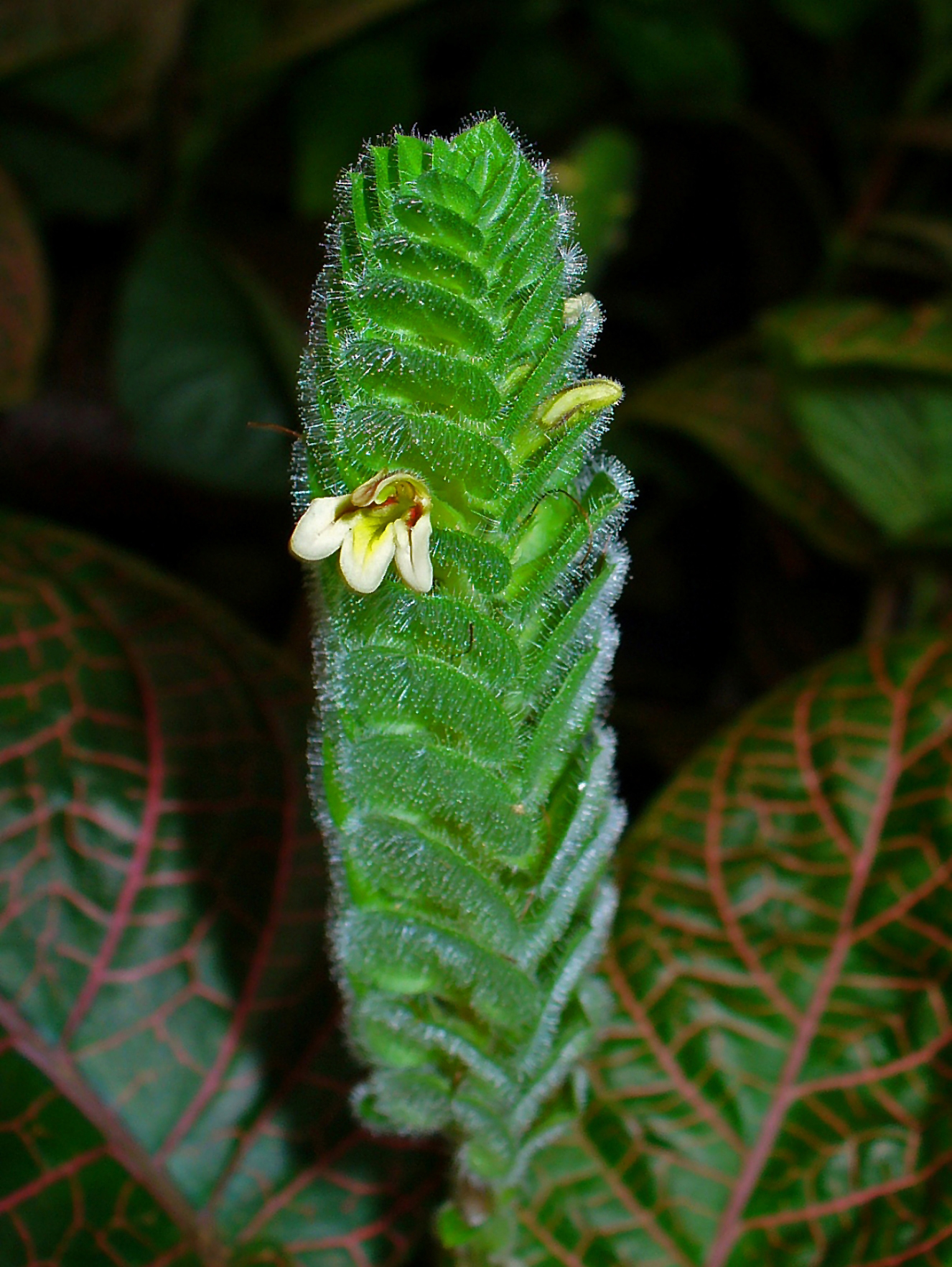
Inflorescence

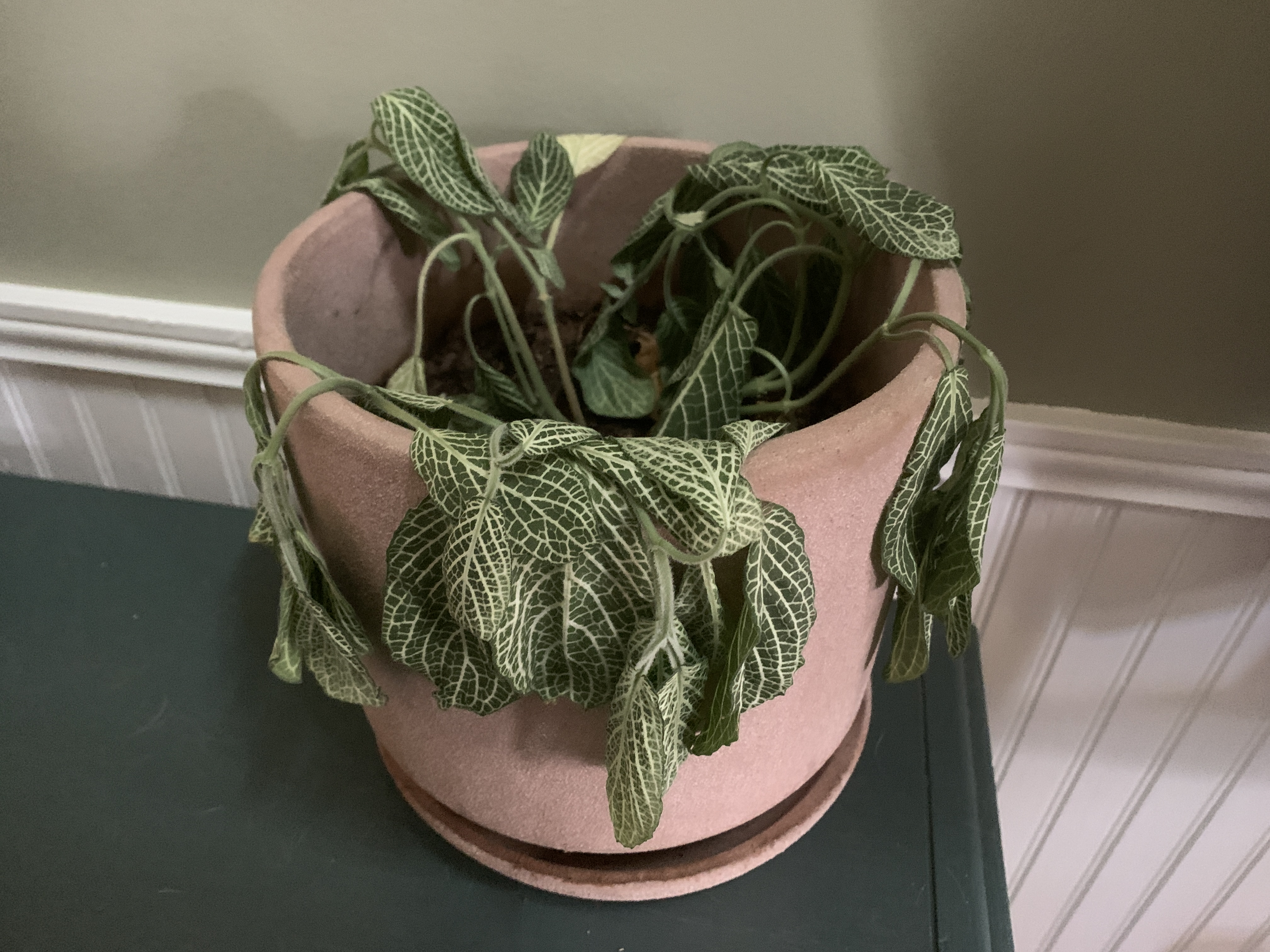
A "fainted" or dried-out Fittonia albivenis. Though it appears dead, it will revive back to a normal state after being watered.

Fittonia albivenis is a creeping evergreen perennial growing to 15 cm (6 in) high, with lush green, ovate leaves, 7 to 10 cm long, with accented veins of white to deep pink and a short fuzz covering its stems. Flowers are small with a white to off-white color.

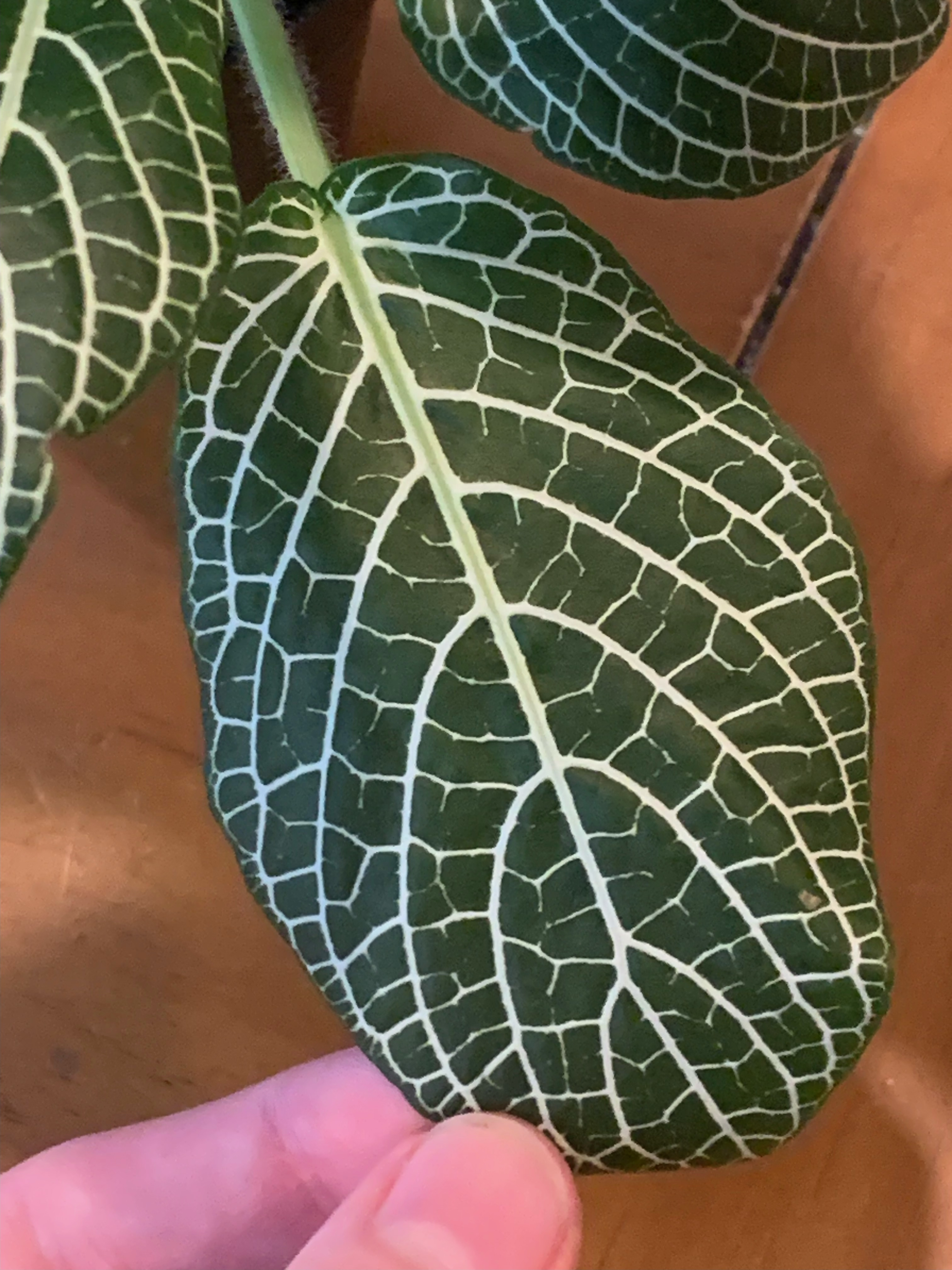
Leaf detail, showing the prominent white veins

== Cultivation ==
The species is used as an ornamental plant that requires fertile soils or substrates based on peat. It is best kept in a moist area with mild sunlight, although it does not demand much light, and temperatures above 55 °F (13 °C). As such, in temperate locations it must be kept under glass as a houseplant.

It must be watered regularly. Without water for a few days, it is known to "faint" but is easily revived with a quick watering and resumes its healthiness. Fittonia albivenis is known to be hard to grow, so it is best bought at a nursery then cared for. Its spreading habit makes it ideal as groundcover.

Numerous cultivars have been selected, falling into two cultivar groups, the Argyroneura Group (formerly F. argyroneura, F. verschaffeltii var. argyroneura) with silver to white veins, and the Verschaffeltii Group (formerly F. verschaffeltii) with pink to red veins, both of which have gained the Royal Horticultural Society's Award of Garden Merit.

== Uses ==
The Kofan, Siona and Secoya tribes of the Ecuadorian Amazon use F. albivenis as a treatment for headaches, and muscular pain, its leaves were used by the Machiguenga as a hallucinogen before they were introduced to Psychotria viridis. They are said to "produce visions of eyeballs." The leaves of this species are prepared as a tea in the northwestern part of the Amazon region and used for toothache.

== See also ==
- Psychedelic plants
