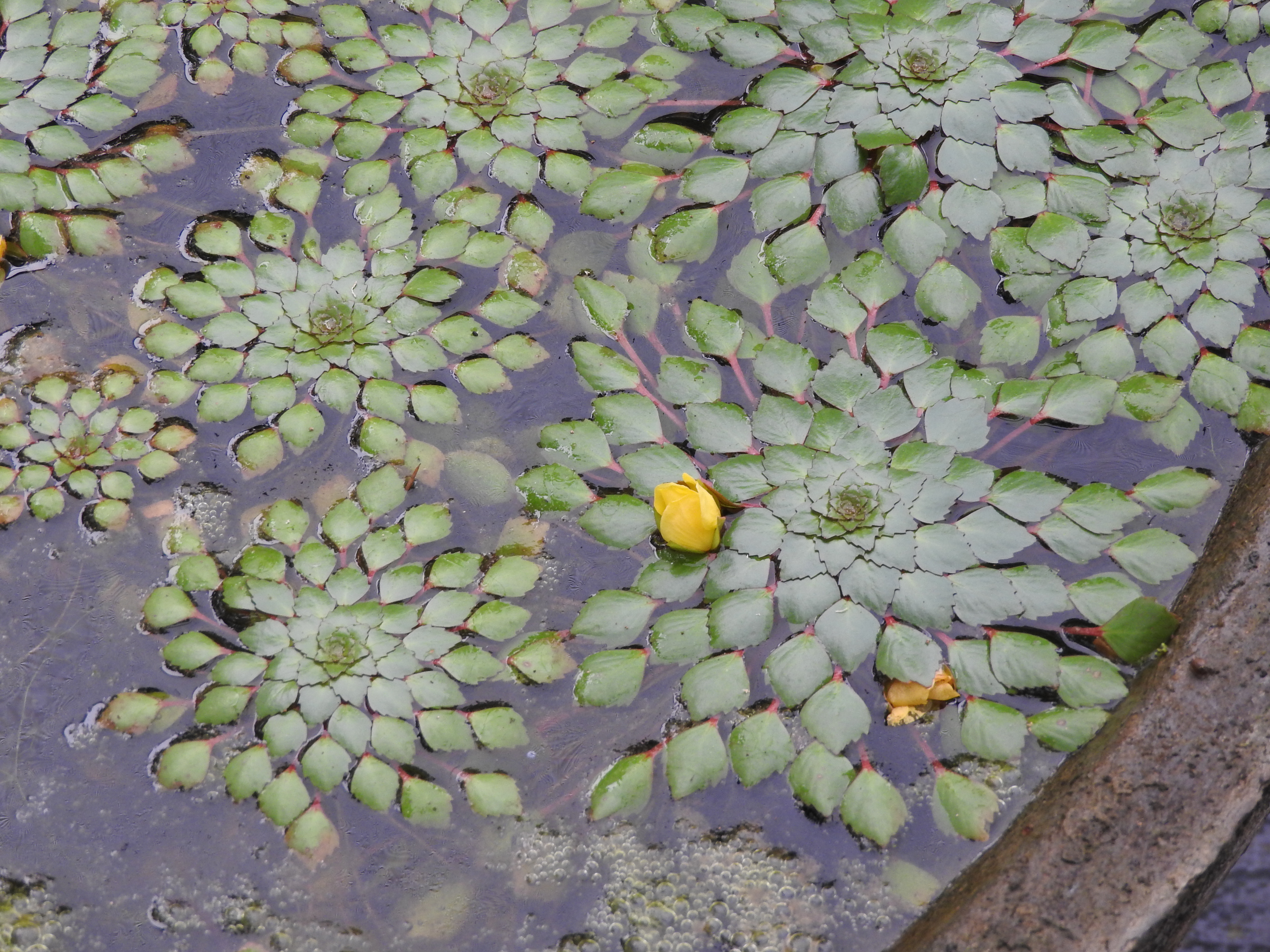

Scientific classification
- Kingdom: Plantae
- Clade: Embryophytes
- Clade: Tracheophytes
- Clade: Spermatophytes
- Clade: Angiosperms
- Clade: Eudicots
- Clade: Rosids
- Order: Myrtales
- Family: Onagraceae
- Genus: Ludwigia
- Species: L. sedioides

Binomial name
- Ludwigia sedioides (Humb. & Bonpl.) H.Hara

Synonyms
- Jussiaea sedioides Bonpl.

= Ludwigia sedioides =

Species of flowering plant

Ludwigia sedioides, commonly known as mosaic flower and false loosestrife, is a herbaceous perennial plant of the family Onagraceae. It has yellow flowers that bloom from June to August. Native to Brazil and Venezuela, its habitat includes wet, swampy localities.

It may be invasive in some areas.

== Description ==
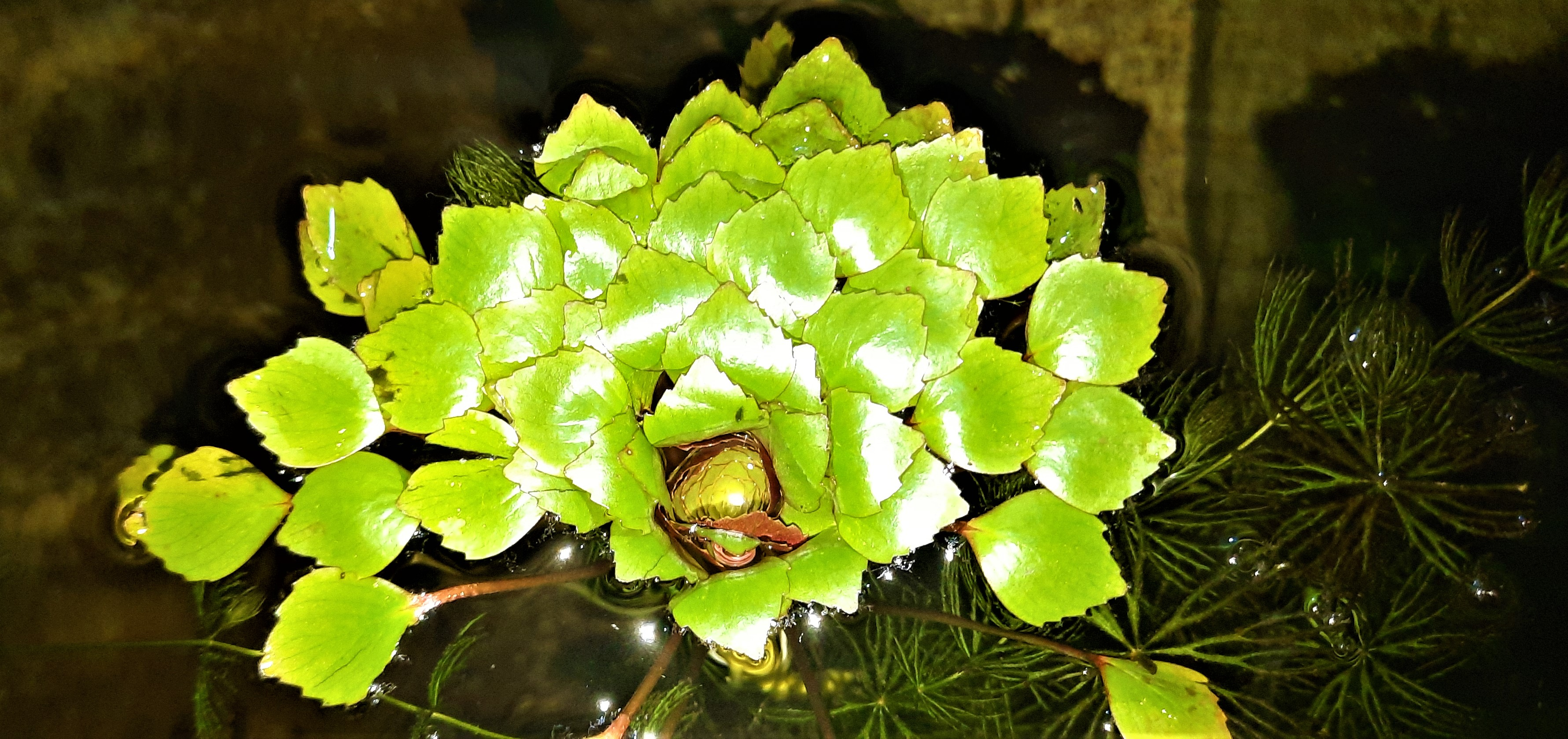
Ludwigia sedioides or the mosaic plant, contracted at night.

=== Vegetative characteristics ===
It is an aquatic herbaceous shrub. It is found in standing pools of water with leaves floating on the surface, or growing in very swampy wet soils. The stems of this plant are reddish and brittle. Leaves are diamond-shaped with toothed margins, radiate outwards to form mosaic-like rosettes. The edges of central and older leaves turn bright red when the plant is grown under bright light or sunlight. Leaf rosettes are fully extended during daytime with gaps in between leaves. At night, the rosettes contract such that the leaves overlap one another.

=== Generative characteristics ===
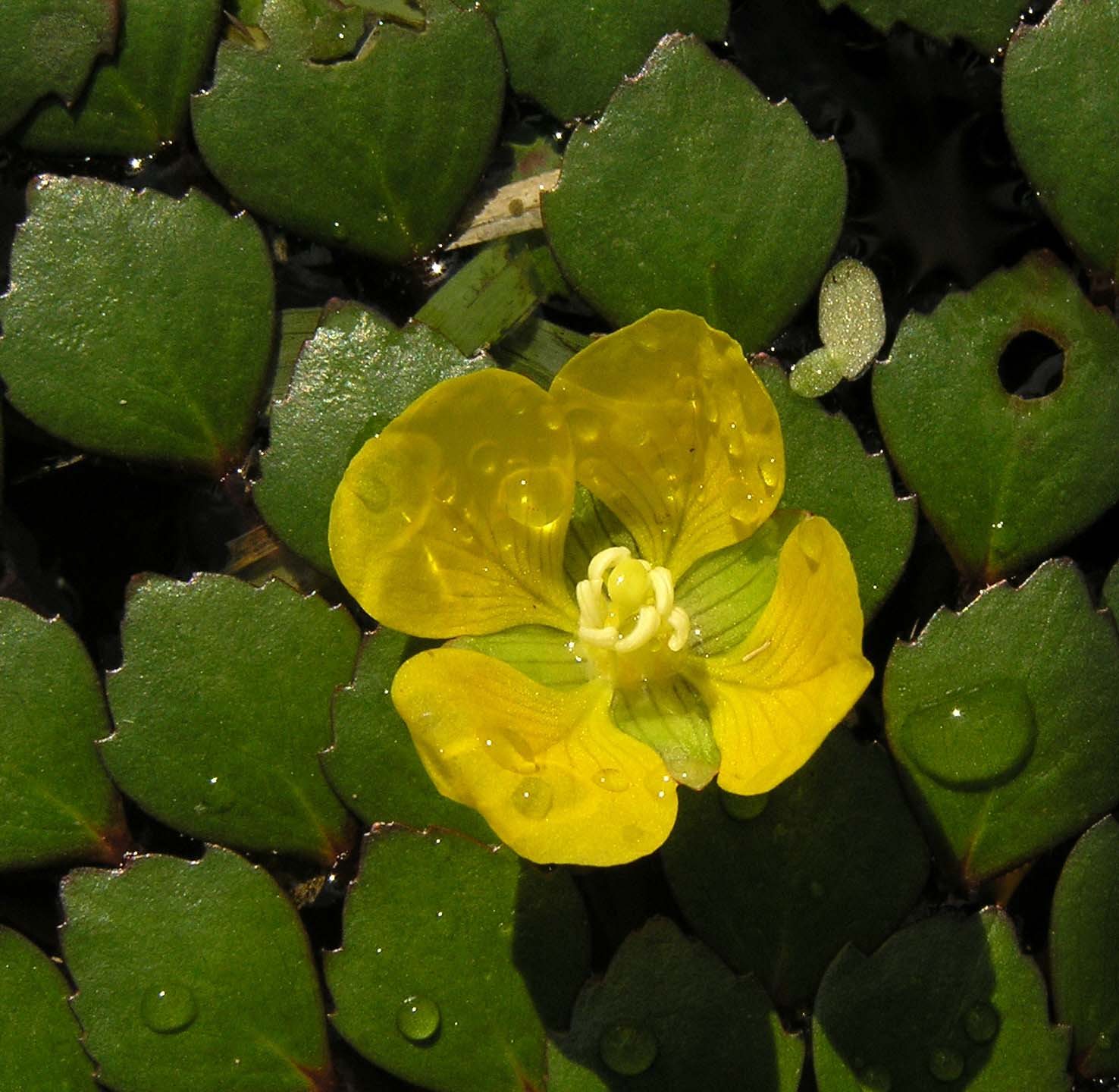
Ludwigia sedoides flower

The flowers are bright yellow, cup-shaped, solitary, produced in leaf axils from June to August in native habitats. Fruits are explosive capsules. The flower measures 50 mm (2 in) across.

== Taxonomy ==
It was first described as Jussiaea sedioides Bonpl. by Aimé Bonpland in 1805. It was placed into the genus Ludwigia L. as Ludwigia sedioides (Bonpl.) H.Hara by Hiroshi Hara in 1953.

=== Etymology ===
The genus Ludwigia was named after German botanist and professor of medicine, Christian Gottlieb Ludwig. Ludwig corresponded with Carl Linnaeus about plant classifications, and Linnaeus dedicated the genus Ludwigia in honor of Ludwig. The species epithet sedioides means 'resembling sedum', a reference to the leaves which resemble those of certain Sedum species in terms of appearance and color changes under strong light.

== Distribution and habitat ==
The majority of Ludwigia sedioides are found in subtropical America. Mosaic plant is native to Central America and South America, primarily Venezuela, Panama, Colombia, and Brazil. Due to its rapid growth, efficient mode of reproduction, and aggressive nature, it has been identified as a potentially invasive plant in Sri Lanka. In the future, it may pose a threat to Sri Lanka's biodiversity.

== Use ==
Ludwigia sedioides is an ornamental plant. Hence, apart from its natural habitat, it finds its uses in personal (artificial) ponds and aquariums. Though use in the aquarium is somewhat complicated as the need for sunlight and nutrient matters. This plant is suitable for ponds or containers with 30–60 cm (12–24 in) depth. The plant needs to be rooted in the substrate below the water surface.

== External resources ==
- https://web.archive.org/web/20050116163139/http://www.horticopia.com/hortpix/html/pc3456.htm
