= Leucas flagellifera =

Conservation status
- Vulnerable (IUCN 3.1)

Scientific classification
- Kingdom: Plantae
- Clade: Tracheophytes
- Clade: Angiosperms
- Clade: Eudicots
- Clade: Asterids
- Order: Lamiales
- Family: Lamiaceae
- Genus: Leucas
- Species: L. flagellifera

Binomial name
- Leucas flagellifera (Balf.f.) Gürke

Synonyms
- Lasiocorys flagellifera Balf.f.

Species of plant

Leucas flagellifera is a species of flowering plant in the family Lamiaceae. It is endemic to Socotra. Its natural habitat is subtropical or tropical dry shrubland. The scientific name has been misspelt as Leucas flagellifolia.

== Taxonomy ==
Leucas flagellifera was first described by Max Gürke in 1883 as Lasiocorys flagellifera and transferred to the genus Leucas by Isaac Bayley Balfour in 1884. The 2004 IUCN Red List correctly gives the basionym as Lasiocorys flagellifera but misspells the accepted name as Leucas flagellifolia.
