= Leucas spiculifolia =

Conservation status
- Least Concern (IUCN 3.1)

Scientific classification
- Kingdom: Plantae
- Clade: Embryophytes
- Clade: Tracheophytes
- Clade: Spermatophytes
- Clade: Angiosperms
- Clade: Eudicots
- Clade: Asterids
- Order: Lamiales
- Family: Lamiaceae
- Genus: Leucas
- Species: L. spiculifolia

Binomial name
- Leucas spiculifolia (Balf.f.) Gürke (1895)

Synonyms
- Lasiocorys spiculifolia Balf.f. (1883)

Species of plant

Leucas spiculifolia is a species of flowering plant in the family Lamiaceae. It is a subshrub endemic to the island of Socotra in Yemen. Its natural habitat is on inaccessible cliffs and large boulders along wadis and on escarpments from sea level to 350 m (1,150 ft) elevation.
