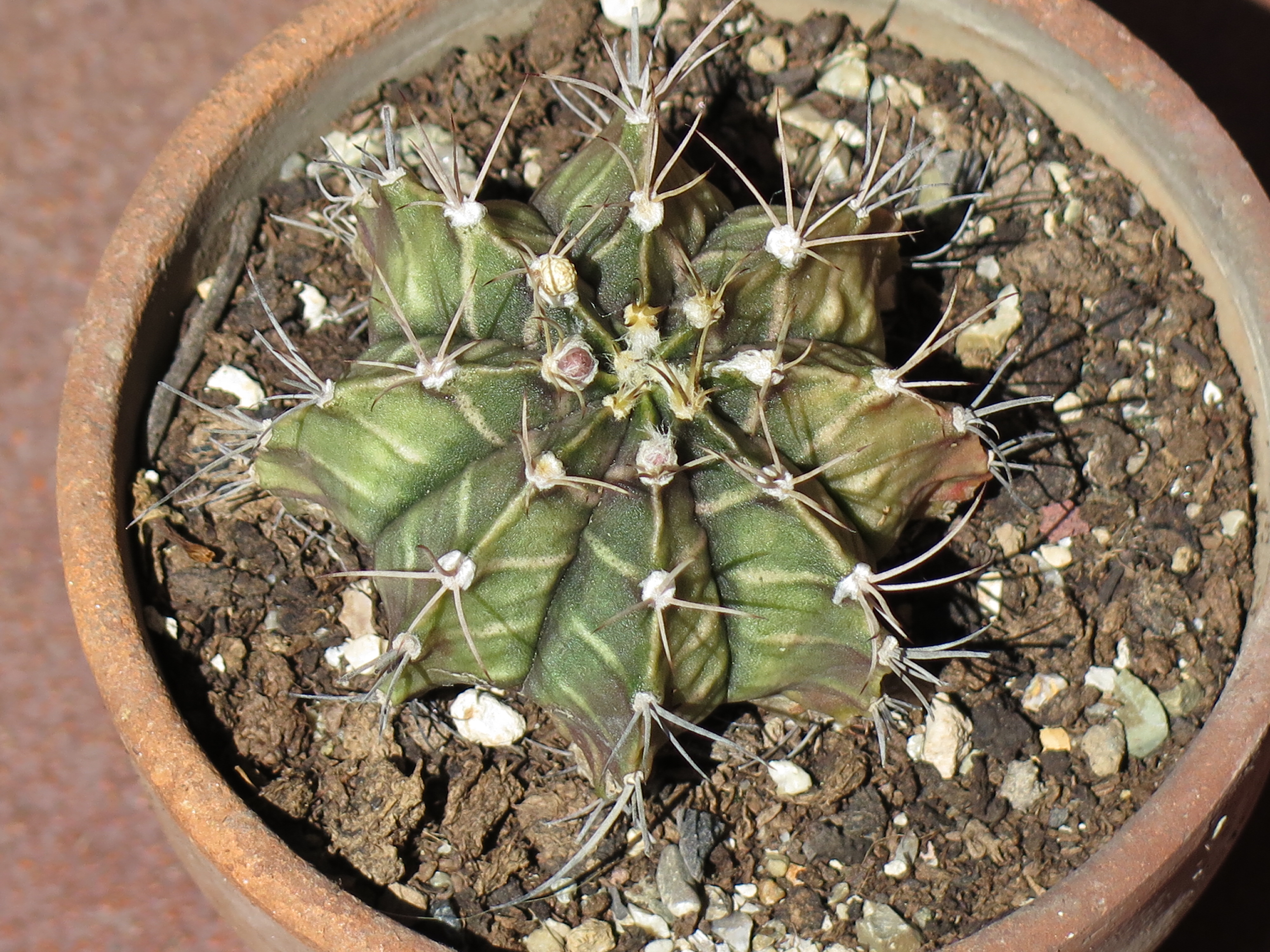

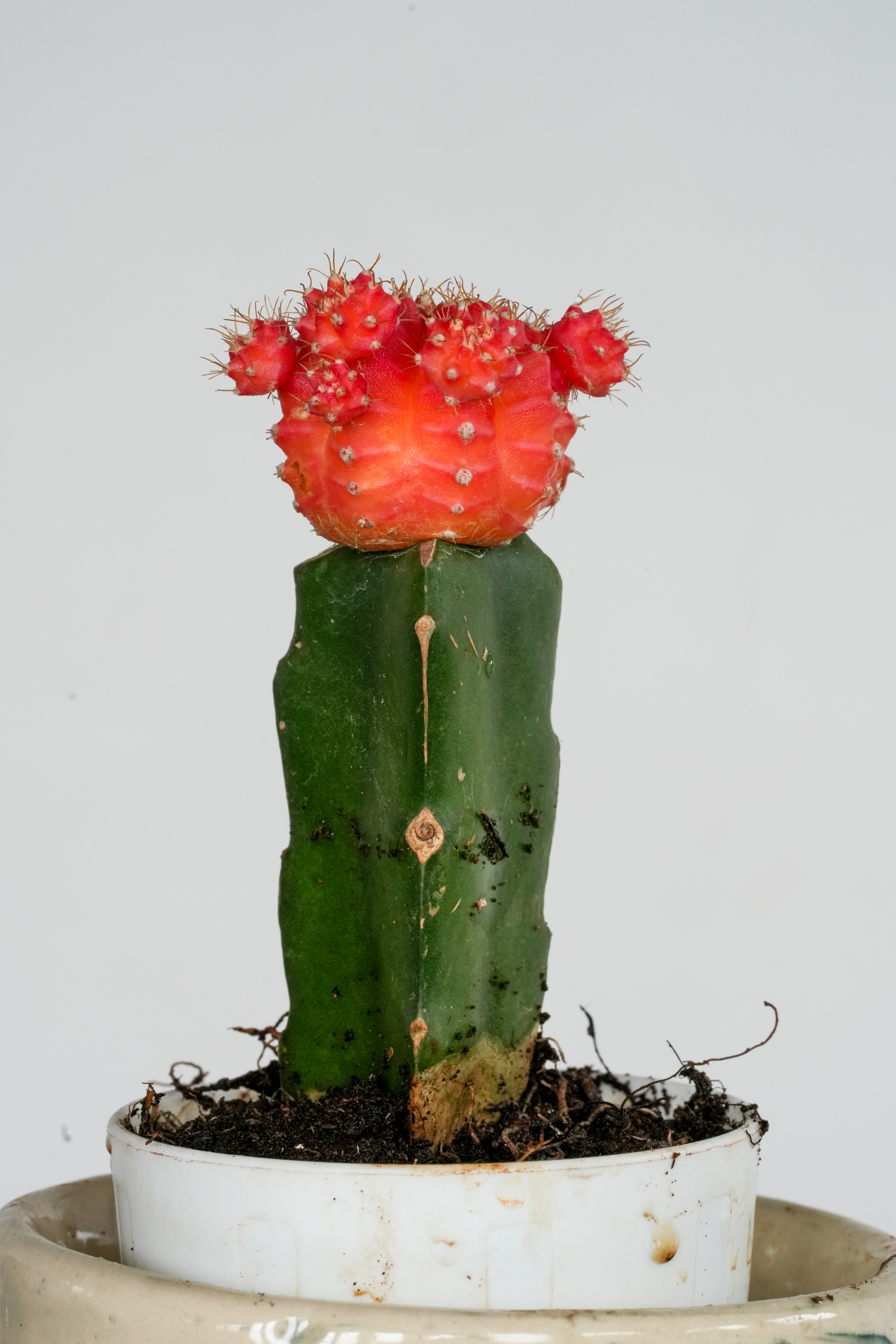

Conservation status
- Least Concern (IUCN 3.1)

Scientific classification
- Kingdom: Plantae
- Clade: Embryophytes
- Clade: Tracheophytes
- Clade: Angiosperms
- Clade: Eudicots
- Order: Caryophyllales
- Family: Cactaceae
- Subfamily: Cactoideae
- Genus: Gymnocalycium
- Species: G. mihanovichii

Binomial name
- Gymnocalycium mihanovichii (Fric ex Gürke) Britton & Rose

Synonyms
- Echinocactus mihanovichii Fric & Gürke; Gymnocalycium friedrichii (Werderm.) Pazout nom. inval.

= Gymnocalycium mihanovichii =

Species of cactus

Gymnocalycium mihanovichii is a species of cactus from South America.

The most popular cultivars are varied mutants which completely lack chlorophyll, exposing the pink, red, orange, or yellow pigmentation; coming from the betalains in the plant becoming exposed.

These mutants, which normally would be unable to survive for even a few days, are often grafted onto a Hylocereus cactus, and the combined plant is called a "moon cactus". Hylocereus is practically an arbitrary choice, as its only purpose in the graft is to provide nutrients for the mutated plant above it. Trichocereus or Cereus can also be used.

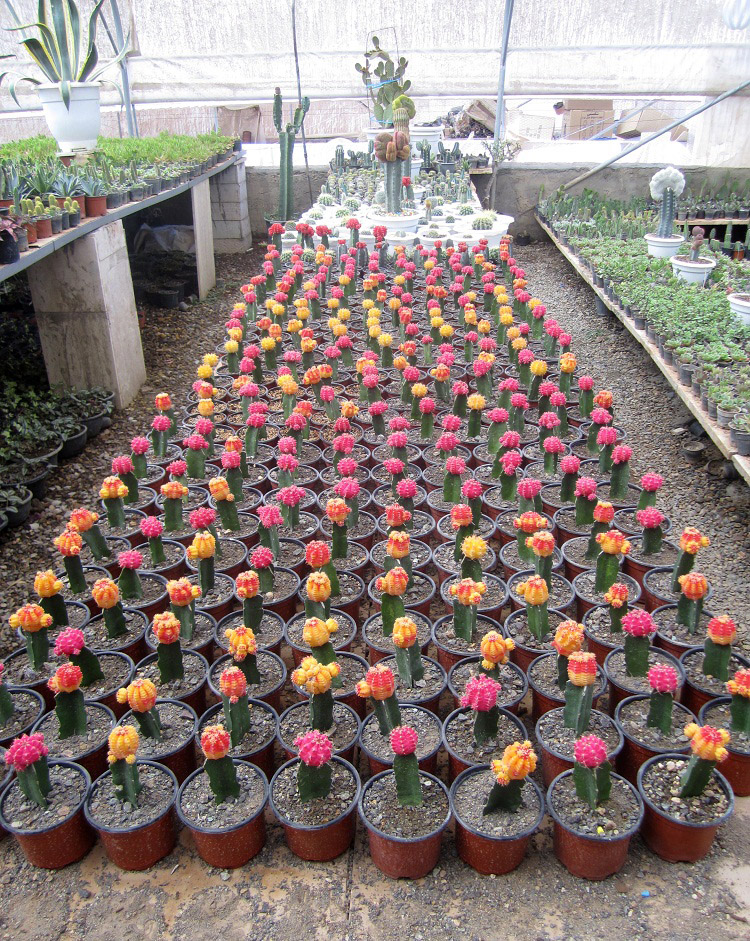
“Moon cacti” in a greenhouse

“Moon cacti” are commonly grown as houseplants. Unfortunately however, most “moon cacti” do not survive for very long due to drastic differences between the growth rate and size; the Gymnocalycium usually maxes out at around a few inches, meanwhile the Hylocereus grows much larger.

== Background ==
Gymnocalycium mihanovichii is found growing at lower elevations up to 500 meters in Paraguay and northeast Bolivia. The species was discovered there in 1903 by Alberto Vojtěch Frič.

The first description of Echinocactus mihanovichii was published in 1905 by Robert Louis August Maximilian Gürke. Nathaniel Lord Britton and Joseph Nelson Rose placed it in the genus Gymnocalycium in 1922.

Gymnocalycium mihanovichii is very variable, therefore numerous varieties have been described.

== Description ==
The individually growing Gymnocalycium mihanovichii have a broad-spherical, gray-green, often reddish overgrown plant body, which reaches stature heights and diameter of 3 to 5 centimeters. The usually 8 ribs are narrow-edged and slightly notched. The 5 to 6 weak, pliable, and slightly curved thorns are greyish-yellow, between 0.8 and 1 centimeter long and partly fall off. The 4 to 5 cm long, bell-shaped to funnel-shaped flowers are yellowish-olive to light olive green. The light green stamens are in two rows. The stylus is also light green; the scar yellowish. The fruits are spindle-shaped.

== Cultivars ==
Cactus can be easily propagated by cutting or offset propagating method.

Gymnocalycium produces offsets easily, even when grafted, which can then be grafted to a new base, perpetuating the plant. Even the best grafts only last a few years, as the base grows faster than the Gymnocalycium. After that point, the difference in speed between the two becomes too great for the graft to hold together, and so they split apart. The scion can, however, be re-grafted back on to the rootstock after this.

The colored species comprise a large group of popular mutants, characterized by more or less colored bodies. They can be red, orange, purplish, yellow, or even white. The first totally decolored mutants were called cv. 'Hibotan'. The first only partially de-chlorophyll were called cv. 'Hibotan Nishiki' and can be grown on its own roots. The 'Nishiki' all contain chlorophyll but with many anthocyanin and appear deep brown. By the time many other colored were obtained and some have special names such as 'Akagurohibotan-Nishiki' or 'Pink-Kuro'.

== Habitat ==
A number of Gymnocalyciums prefer shade in the wild, being cloaked under shrubs or grasses, while others prefer abundant sunlight. Moon cactus, for one, thrives best in bright, indirect light, and can be grown indoors year round. Those preferring plentiful sunshine may need covering from the sun in the hottest months, but exaggerating this will result in loss of flowers. The balance of the potting medium should be adequate to allow decent drainage so that the plants do not sit in marshy soil for more than a day or two after watering. During the summer months, the plant may need frequent watering, though those in small pots would need weekly watering. Nevertheless, the compost should be virtually dry before re-watering. Watering in the winter months is unnecessary.

== Gallery ==
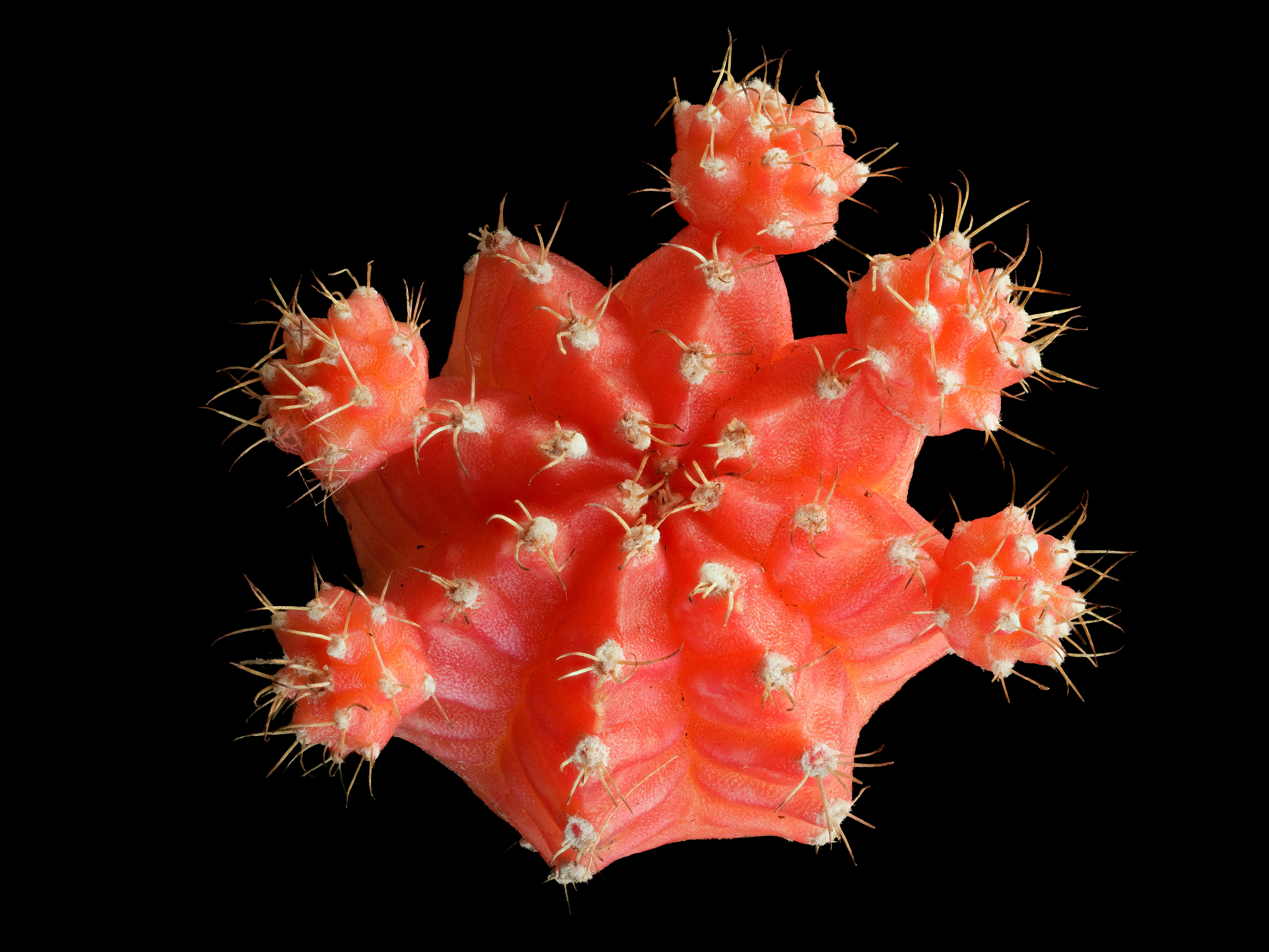
Top view of grafted G. mihanovichii

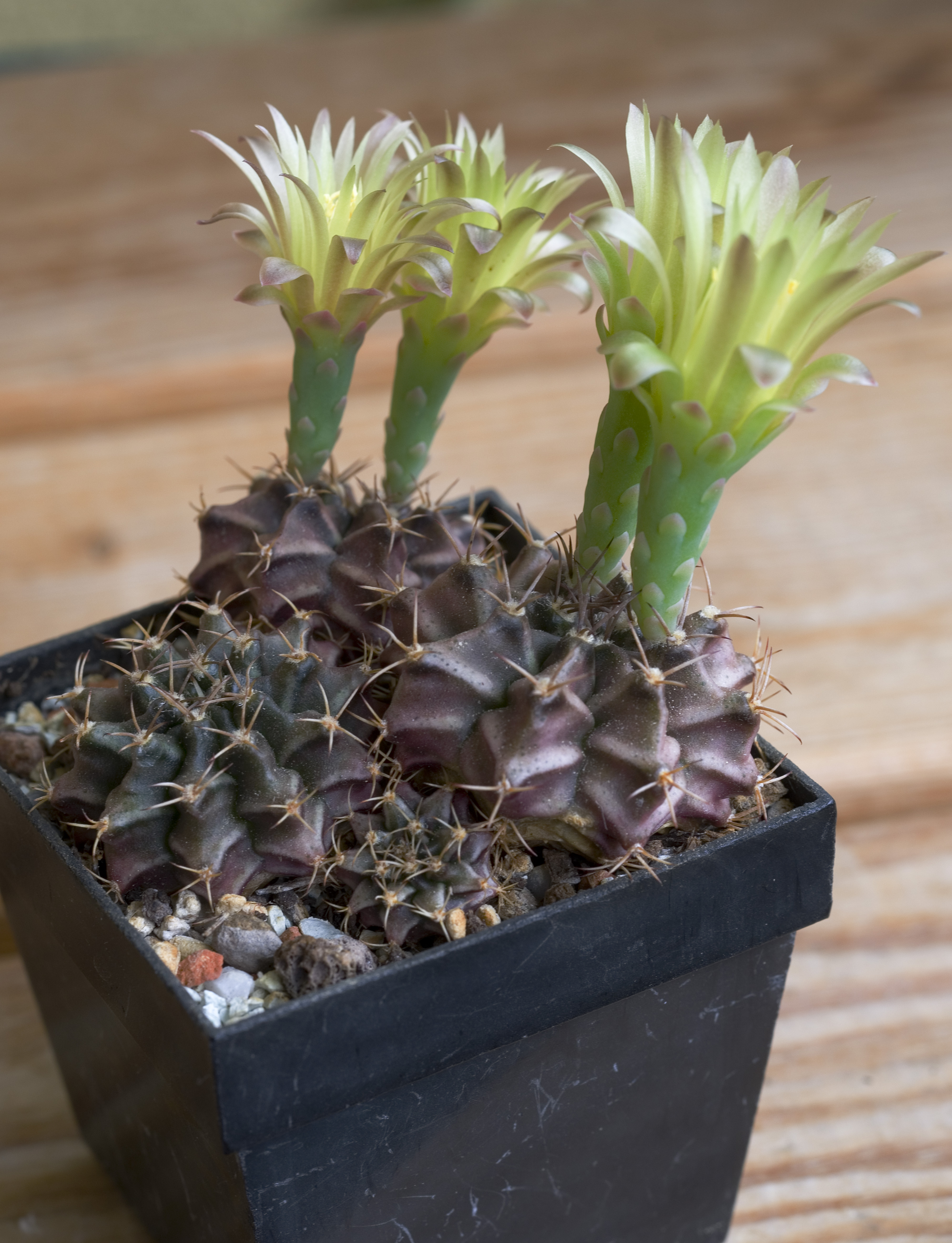
G. mihanovichii flowers

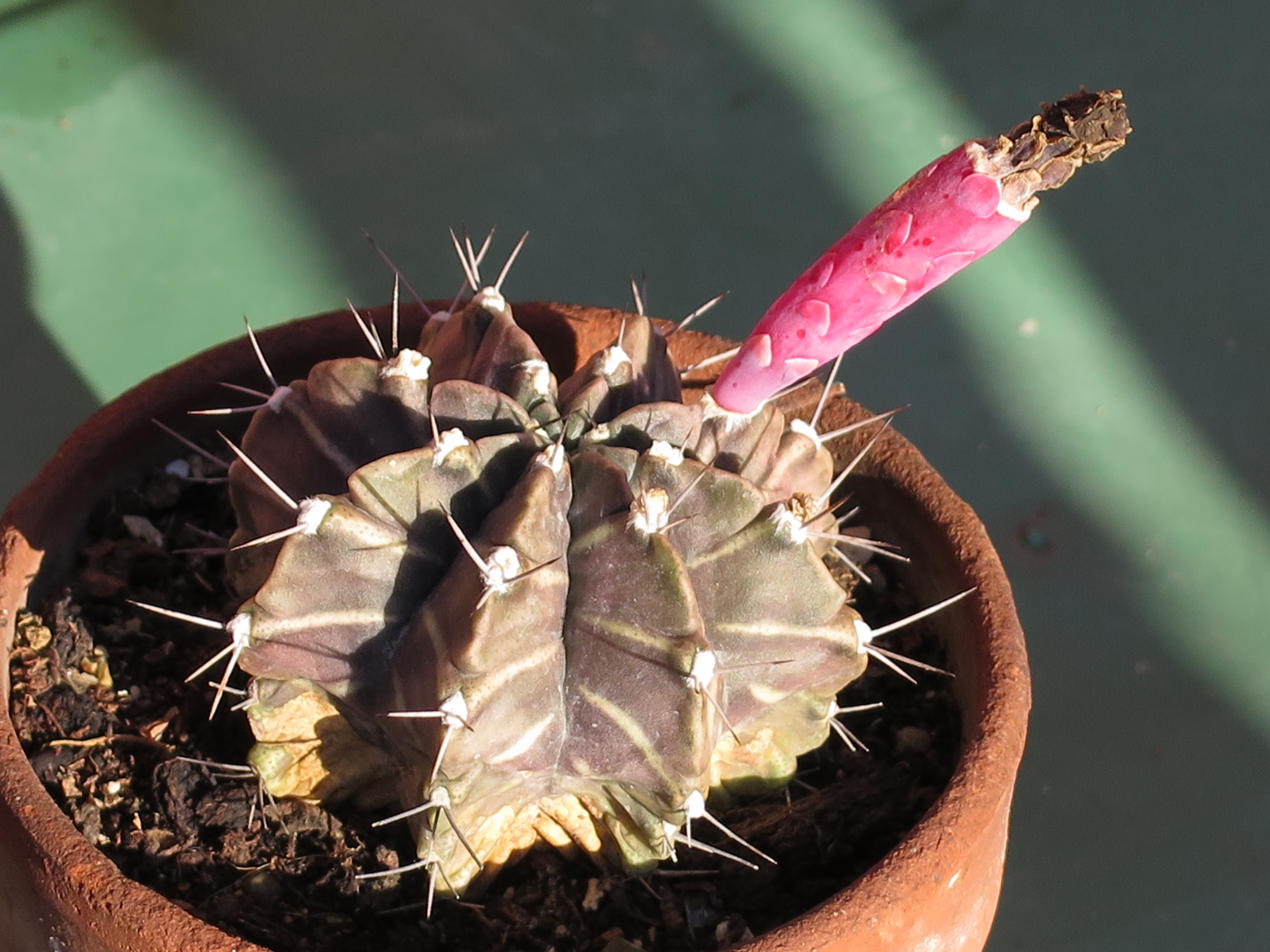
G. mihanovichii fruit

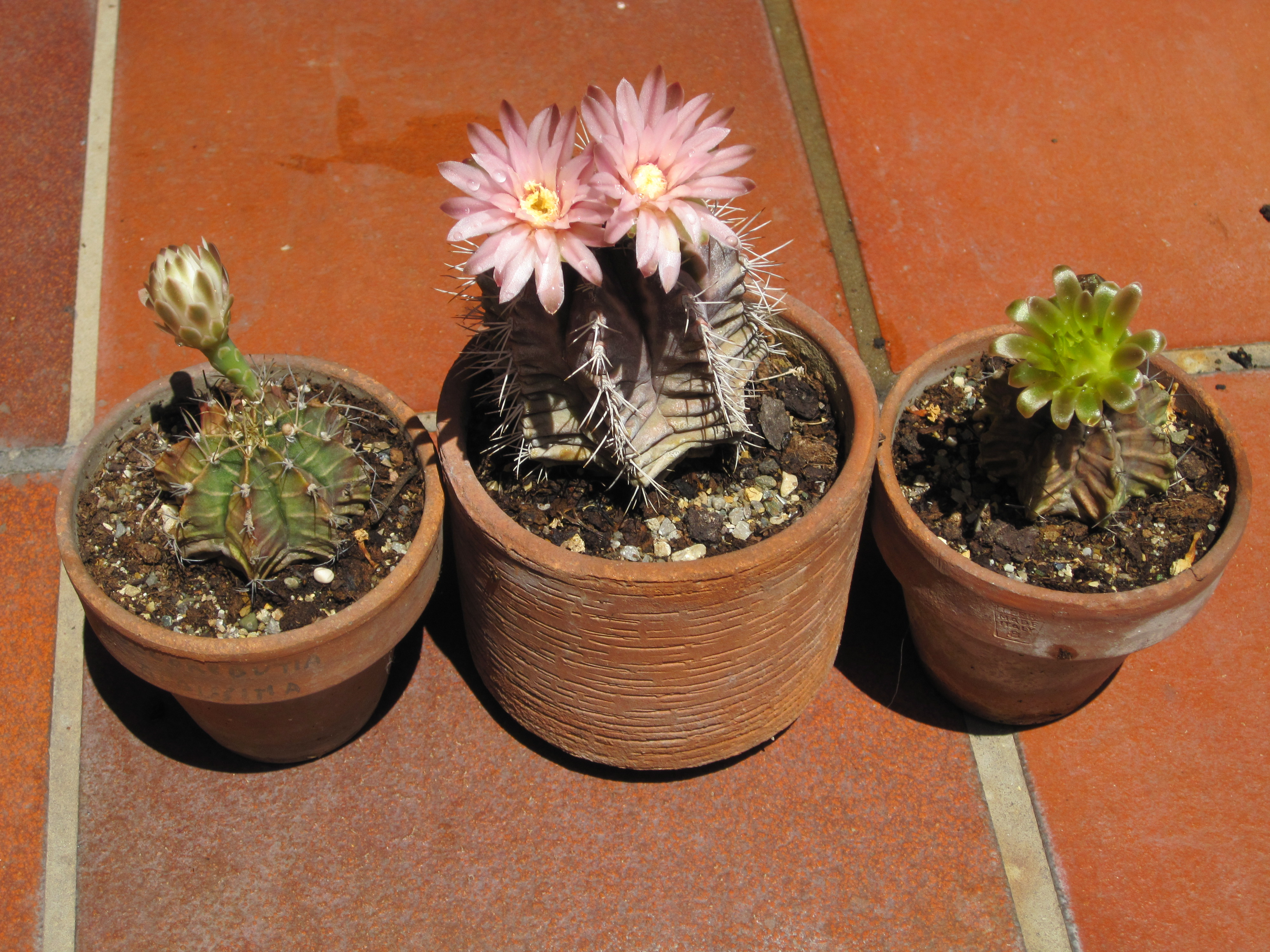
G. mihanovichii along with two G. stenopleurum plants

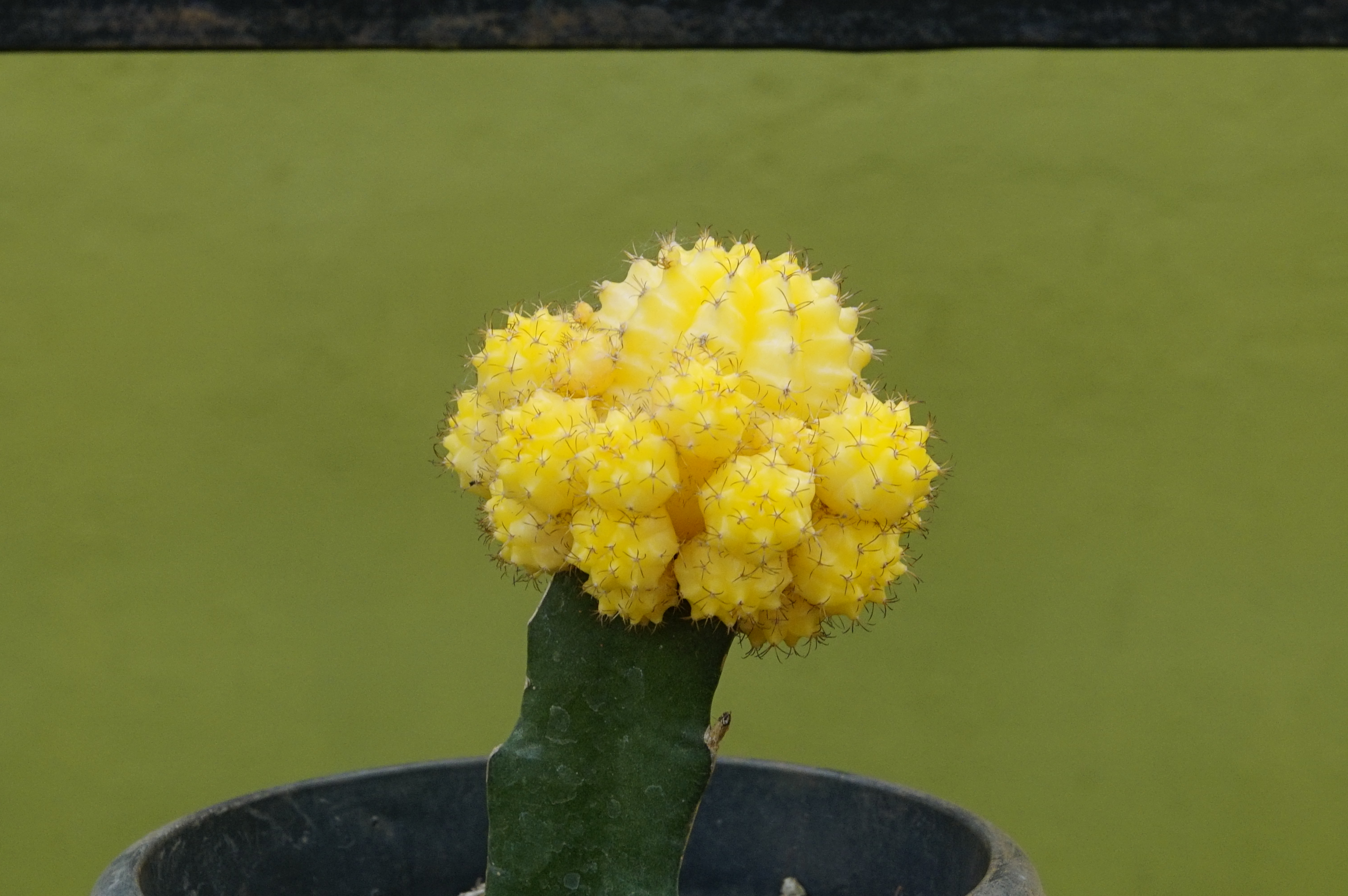
A potted moon cactus created from a yellow G. mihanovichii

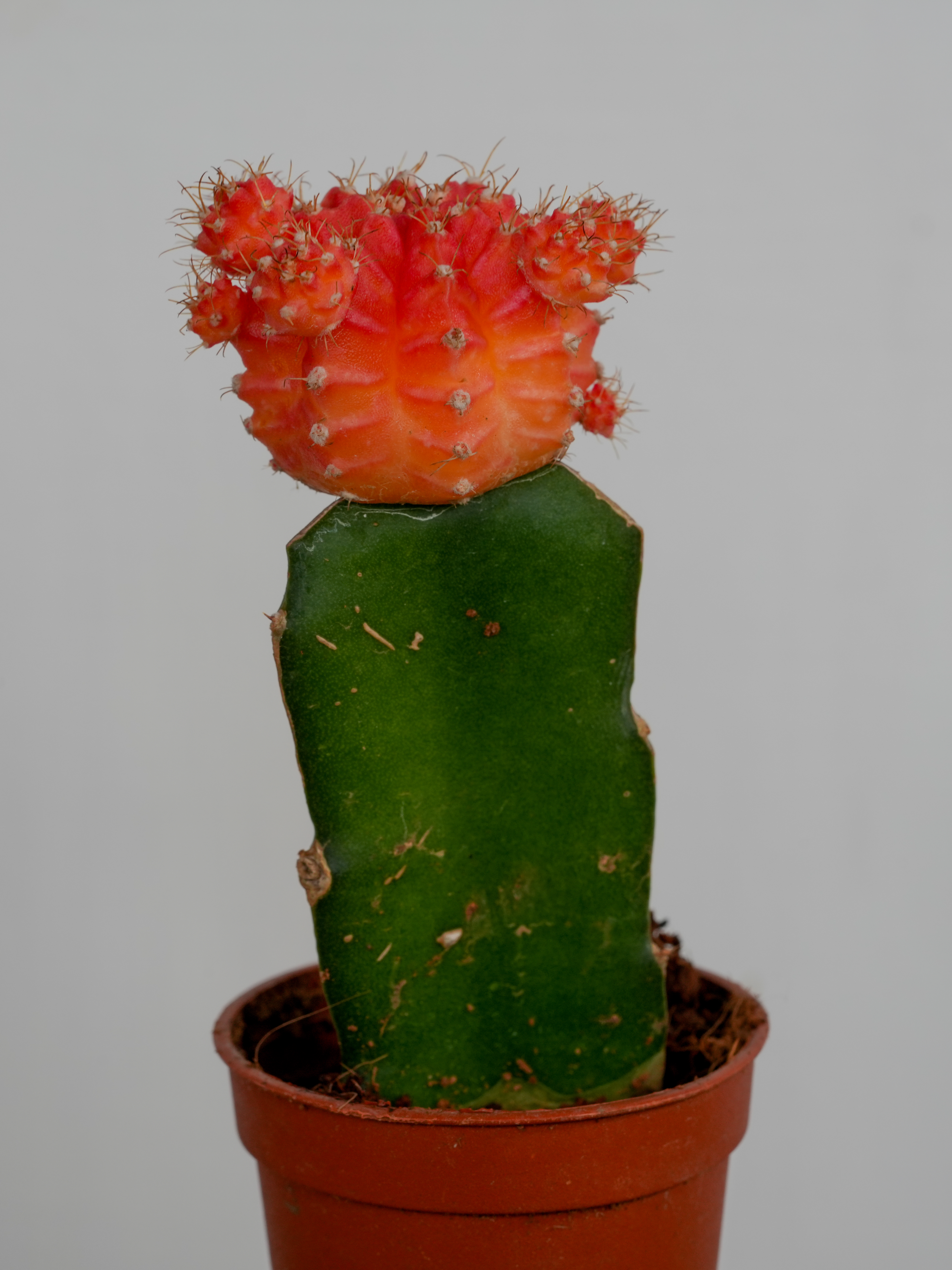
A moon cactus created from a red G. mihanovichii

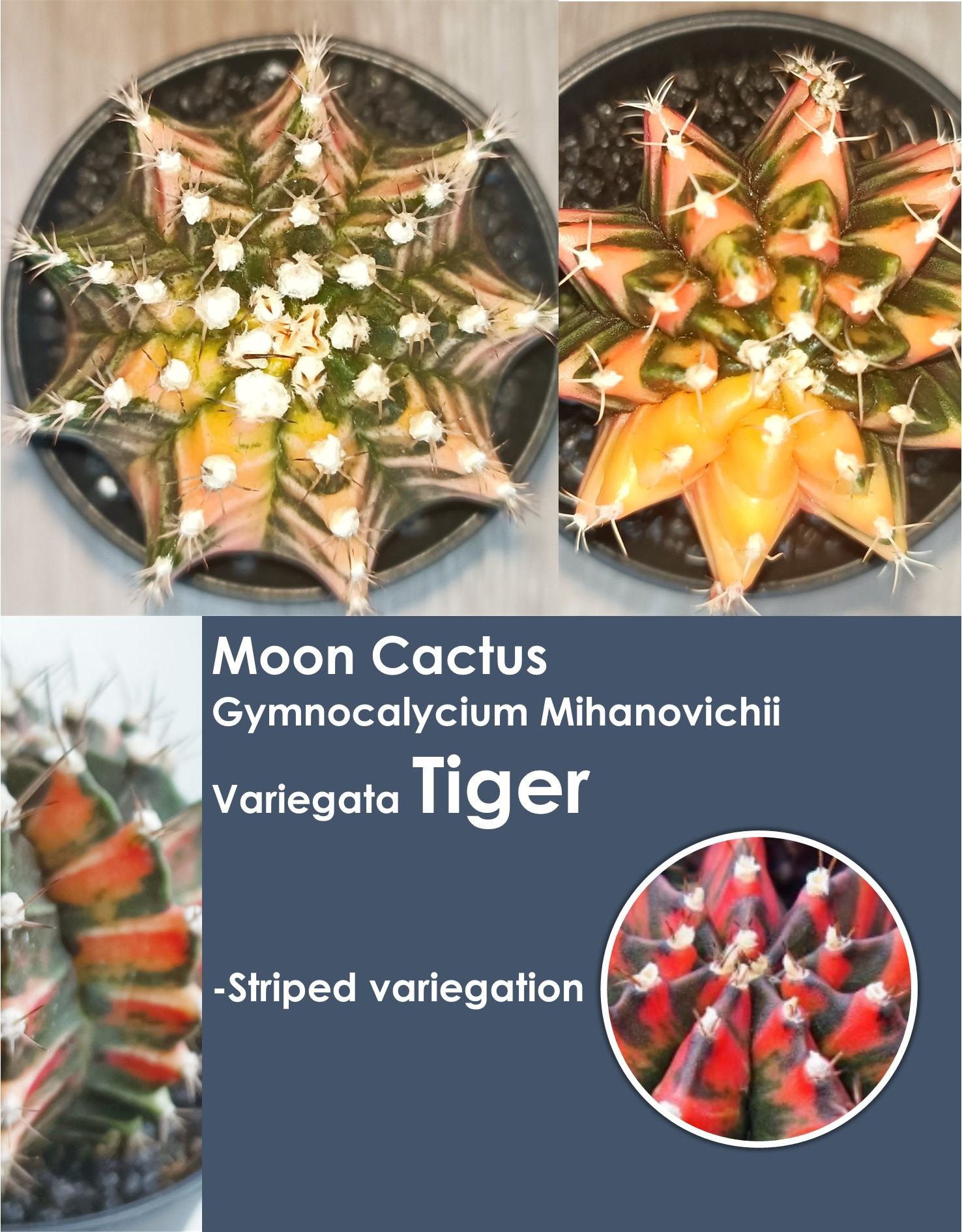
Moon cactus G. mihanovichii var. Tiger

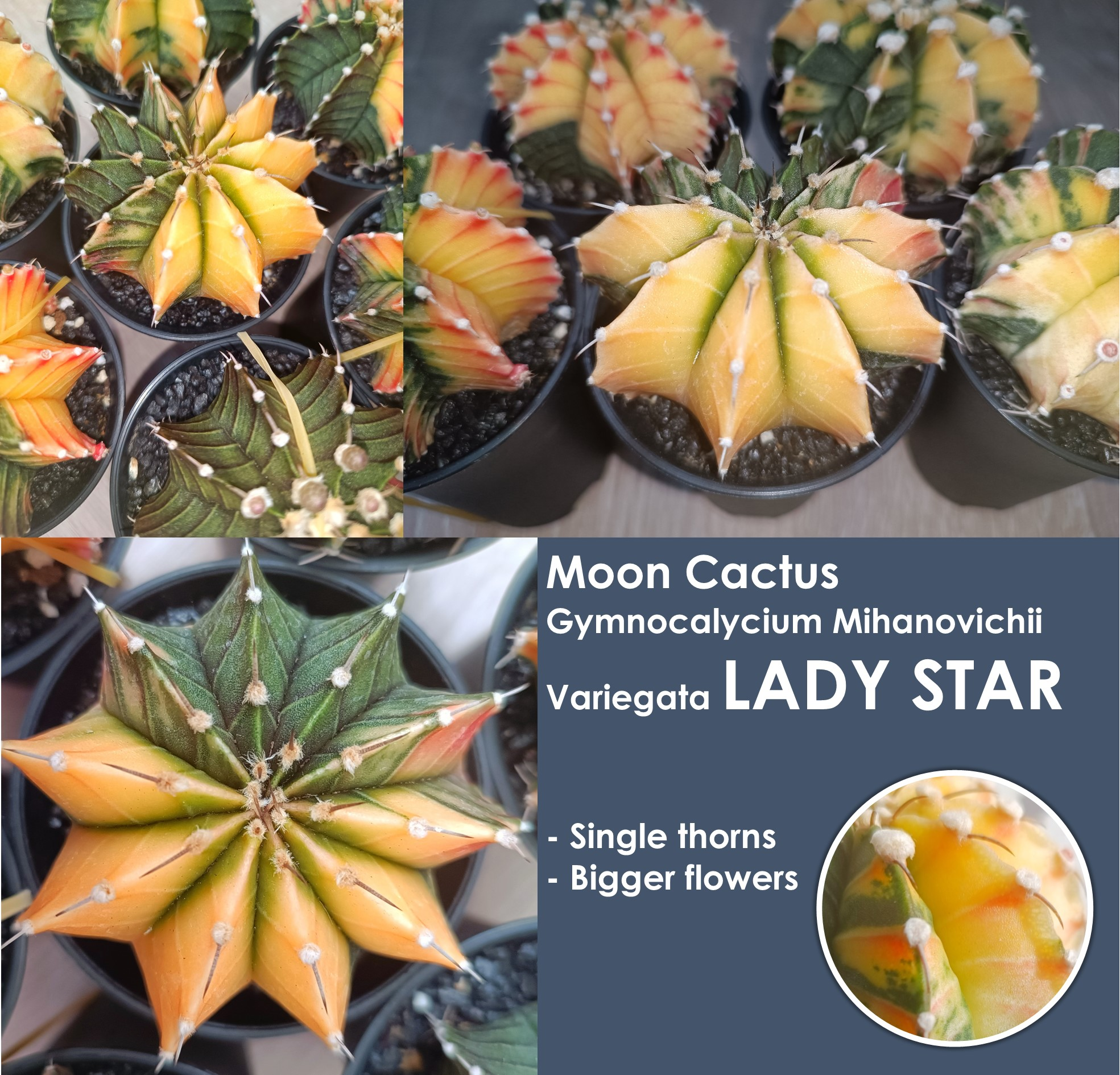
Moon cactus G. mihanovichii var. Lady Star

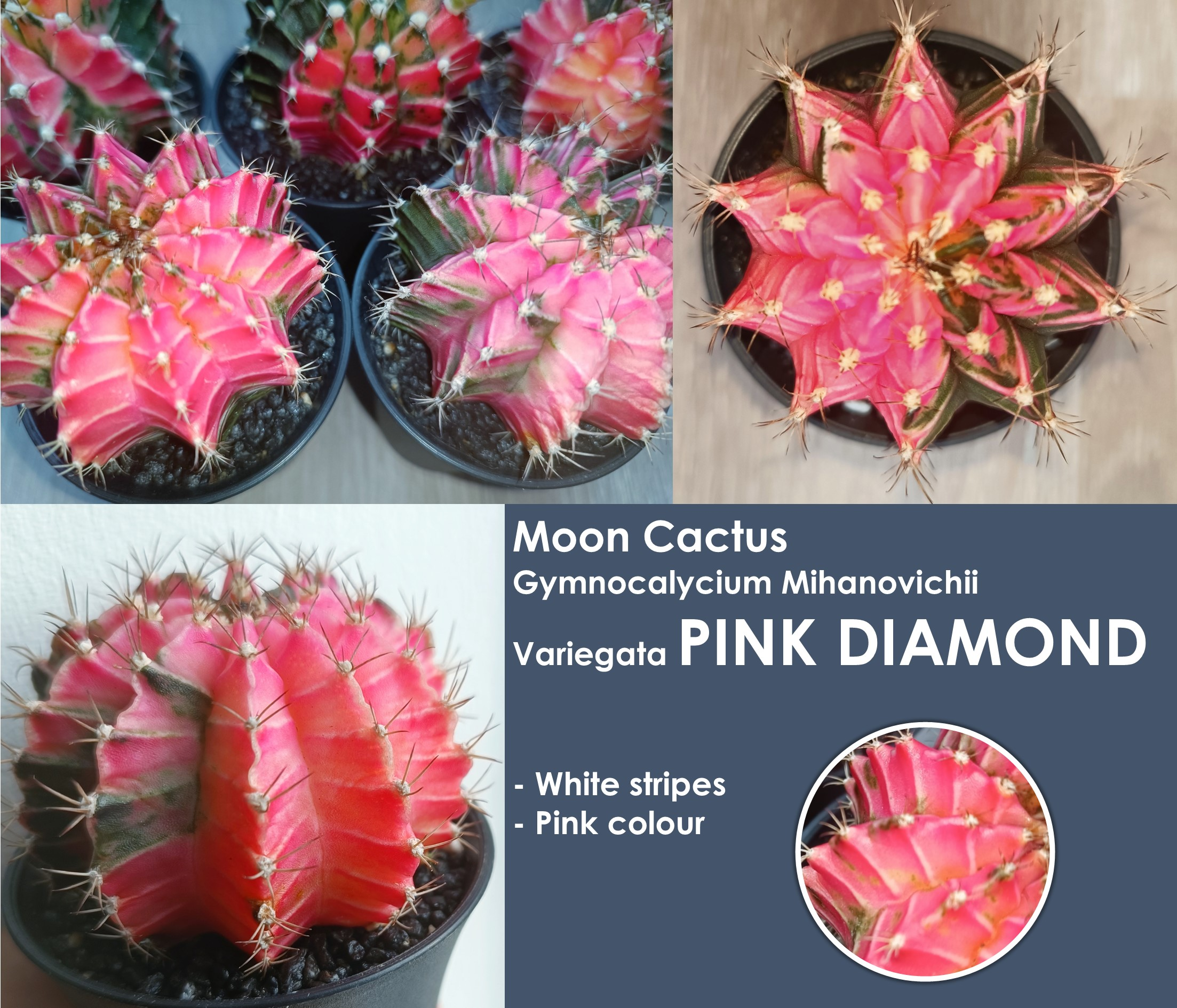
Moon cactus G. mihanovichii var. Pink Diamond

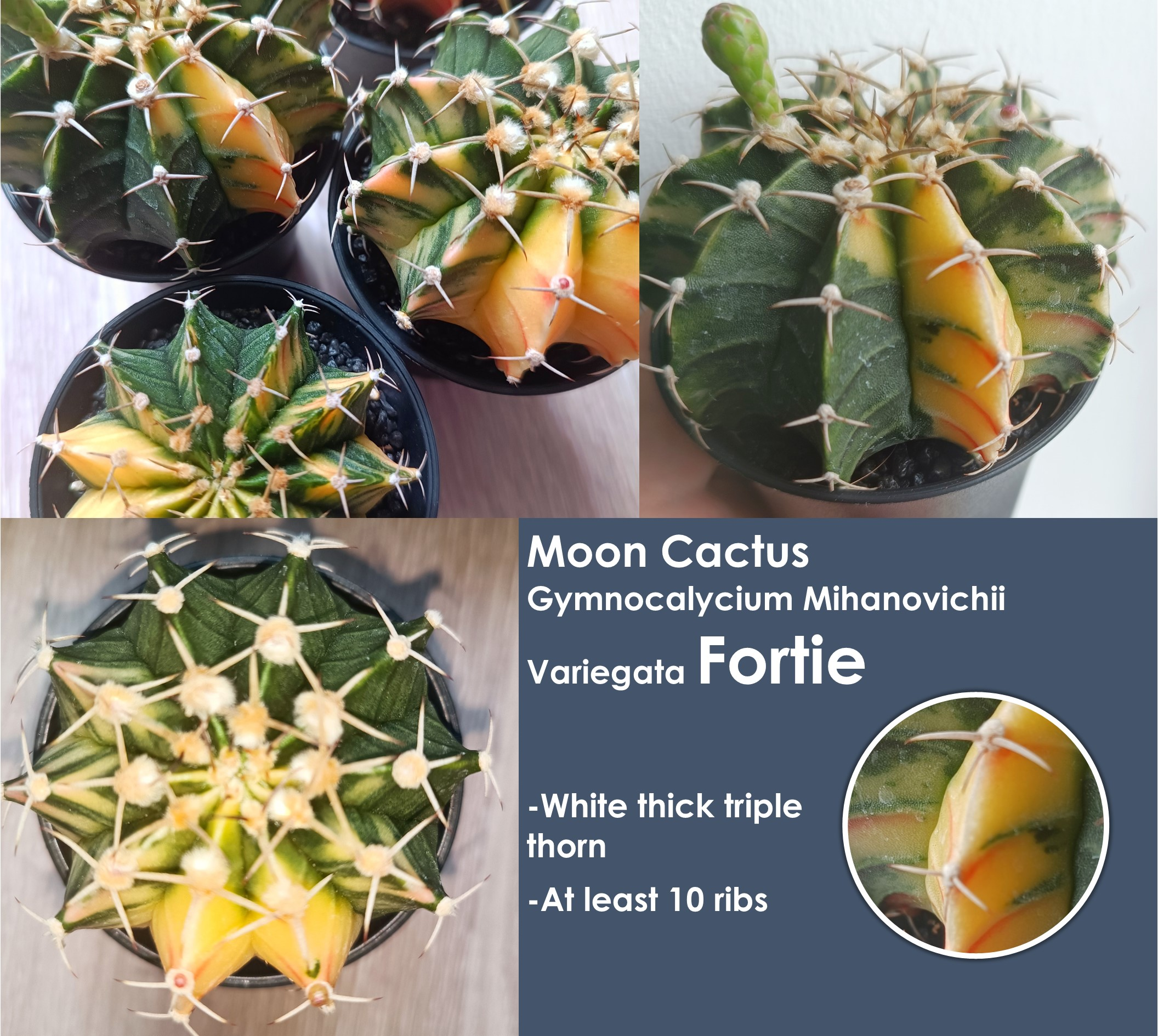
Moon cactus G. mihanovichii var. Fortie
