= Moon cactus =

Moon cactus or mooncactus may refer to:

- Gymnocalycium mihanovichii, often called chin cactus. Sold with colored mutants grafted to a green base.
- Epiphyllum anguliger, commonly known as the fishbone cactus
- Harrisia martinii, or Martin's apple-cactus, a night blooming cactus
