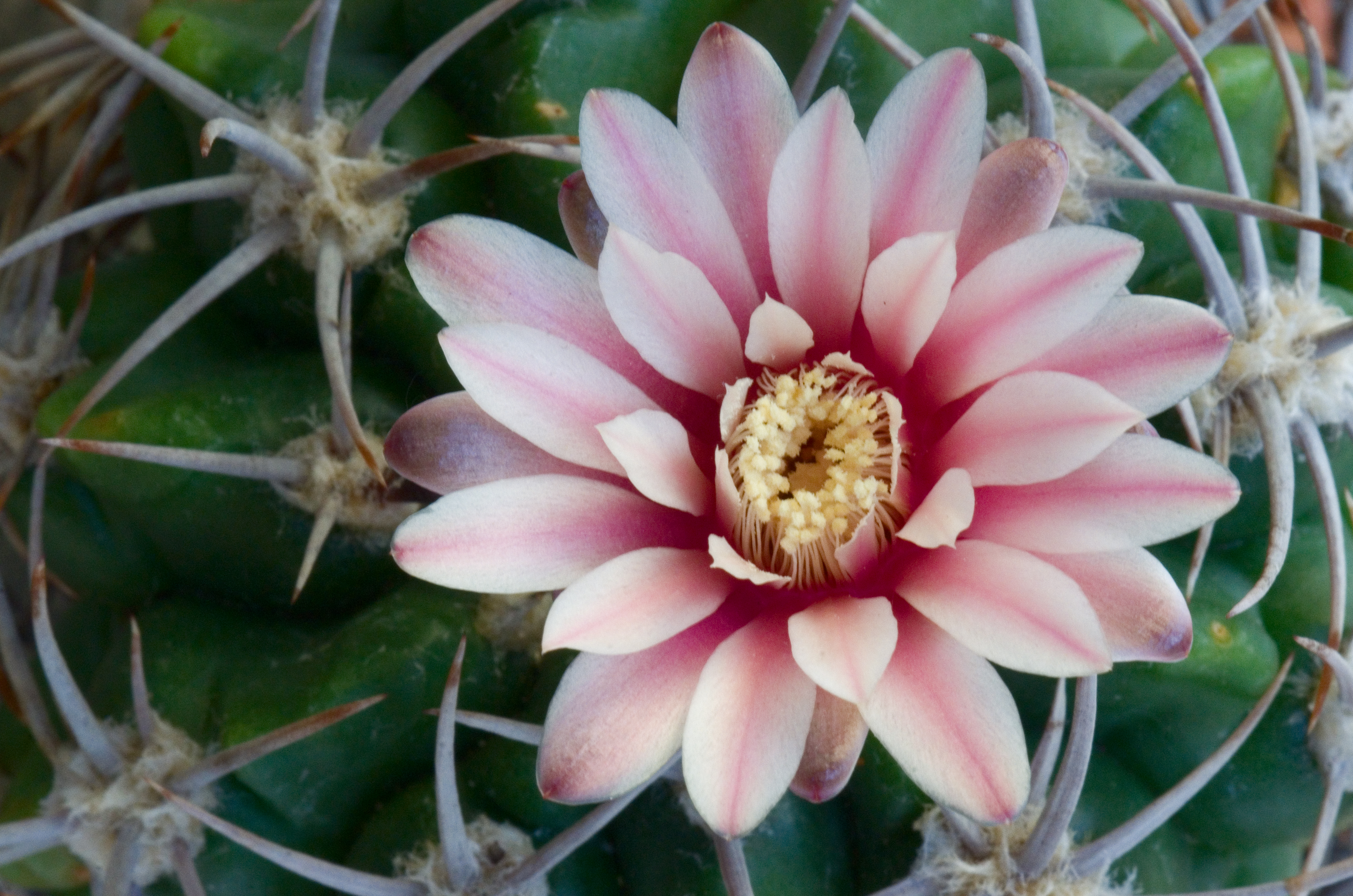

Conservation status
- Least Concern (IUCN 3.1)

Scientific classification
- Kingdom: Plantae
- Clade: Embryophytes
- Clade: Tracheophytes
- Clade: Spermatophytes
- Clade: Angiosperms
- Clade: Eudicots
- Order: Caryophyllales
- Family: Cactaceae
- Subfamily: Cactoideae
- Genus: Gymnocalycium
- Species: G. mostii

Binomial name
- Gymnocalycium mostii (Gürke) Britton & Rose 1918

Synonyms
- List: Echinocactus mostii Gürke 1906; Echinocactus centeterius Lehm. ex Pfeiff. 1837; Echinocactus centeterius var. major Lem. & Monv. 1839; Echinocactus centeterius f. pachycentrus (Lehm. ex Pfeiff.) Schelle 1926; Echinocactus centeterius var. pachycentrus (Lehm. ex Pfeiff.) Salm-Dyck 1850; Echinocactus kurtzianus Gürke 1906; Echinocactus pachycentrus Lehm. ex Pfeiff. 1837; Gymnocalycium bicolor (Řepka) V.Gapon 2021; Gymnocalycium bicolor Schütz 1962; Gymnocalycium bicolor subsp. simplex (Řepka) V.Gapon 2021; Gymnocalycium centeterium (Lehm. ex Pfeiff.) Hosseus 1926; Gymnocalycium immemoratum A.Cast. & H.V.Lelong 1939; Gymnocalycium kurtzianum (Gürke) Britton & Rose 1922; Gymnocalycium mostii subsp. bicolor Řepka 2014; Gymnocalycium mostii var. immemoratum (A.Cast. & H.V.Lelong) H.Till & Amerh. 2002; Gymnocalycium mostii var. kurtzianum (Gürke) Backeb. 1936; Gymnocalycium mostii f. kurtzianum (Gürke) H.Till & Amerh. 2002; Gymnocalycium mostii var. miradorense H.Till & Amerh. 2002; Gymnocalycium mostii subsp. prochazkanum (Šorma) G.J.Charles 2013; Gymnocalycium mostii subsp. valnicekianum (Jajó) Mereg. & G.J.Charles 2008; Gymnocalycium prochazkanum Šorma 1999; Gymnocalycium prochazkanum subsp. ivoi Halda & Milt 2006; Gymnocalycium prochazkanum subsp. simile Řepka 2013; Gymnocalycium prochazkanum subsp. simplex Řepka 2013; Gymnocalycium tobuschianum Schick-Freib. 1953; Gymnocalycium valnicekianum Jajó 1934; Gymnocalycium valnicekianum var. bicolor H.Till & Amerh. 2002; Gymnocalycium valnicekianum subsp. prochazkanum (Šorma) H.Till & Amerh. 2002; Neoporteria centeteria (Lehm. ex Pfeiff.) G.D.Rowley 1986; Pyrrhocactus centeterius (Lehm. ex Pfeiff.) A.Berger 1929; Uebelmannia centeteria (Lehm. ex Pfeiff.) Schnabel 1971

= Gymnocalycium mostii =

Species of cactus

Gymnocalycium mostii is a species of Gymnocalycium from Argentina.

== Description ==
Gymnocalycium mostii is a solitary cactus with dark green, flattened spherical stems, growing 6–7 cm tall and up to 13 cm in diameter (occasionally up to 20 cm). It has 11–14 deeply notched ribs divided into humps. The strong, curved spines are yellowish-brown with darker tips, aging to gray. There are 1–2 central spines up to 2 cm long (rarely 3 cm) and 7–11 radial spines ranging from 0.6 to 2.2 cm. The flowers are pink to white, sometimes with a darker throat, and measure up to 8 cm in length and diameter. The egg-shaped fruits are slate to blue-green, up to 1.5 cm in diameter and 2 cm long.

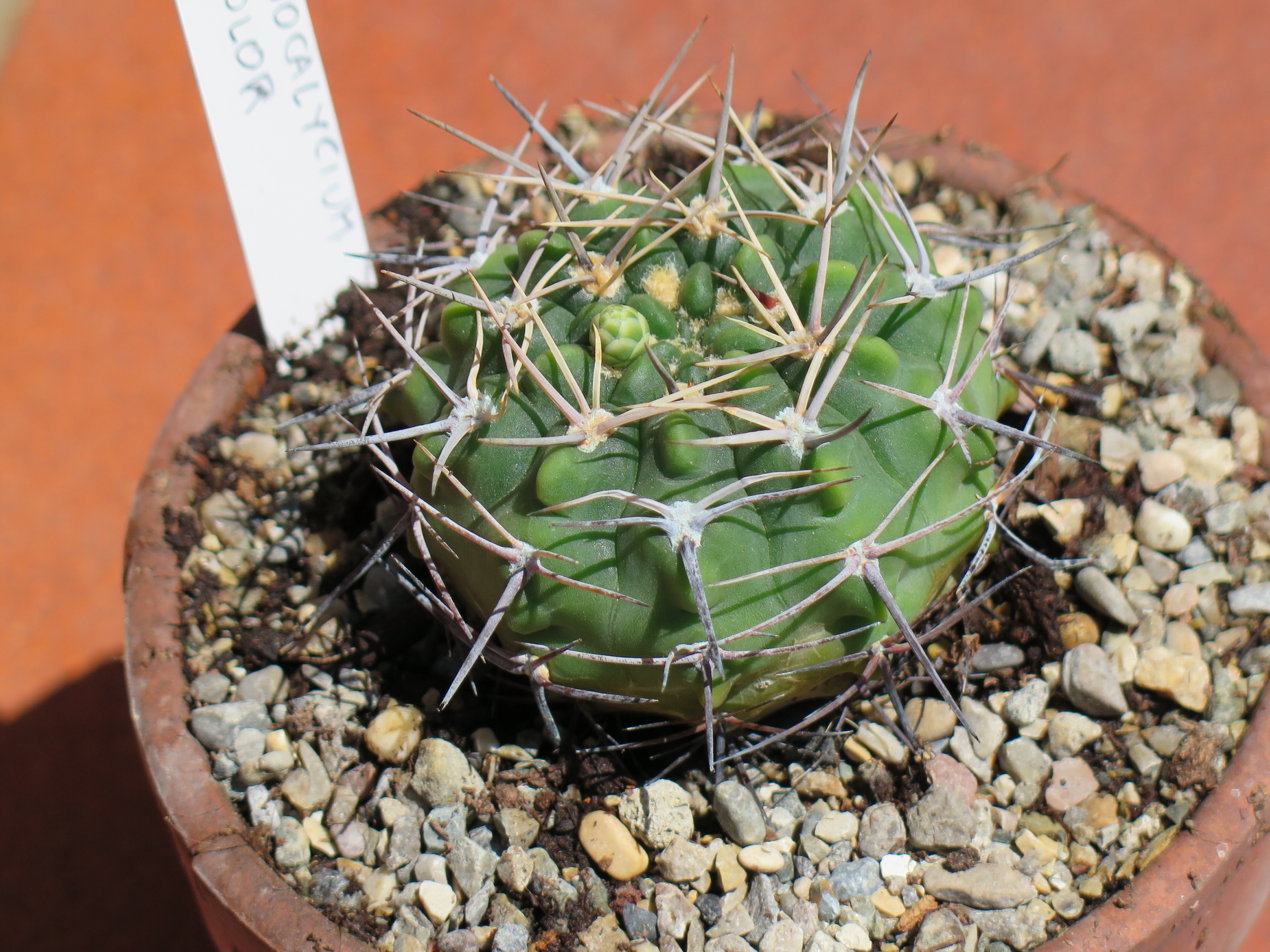
Plant

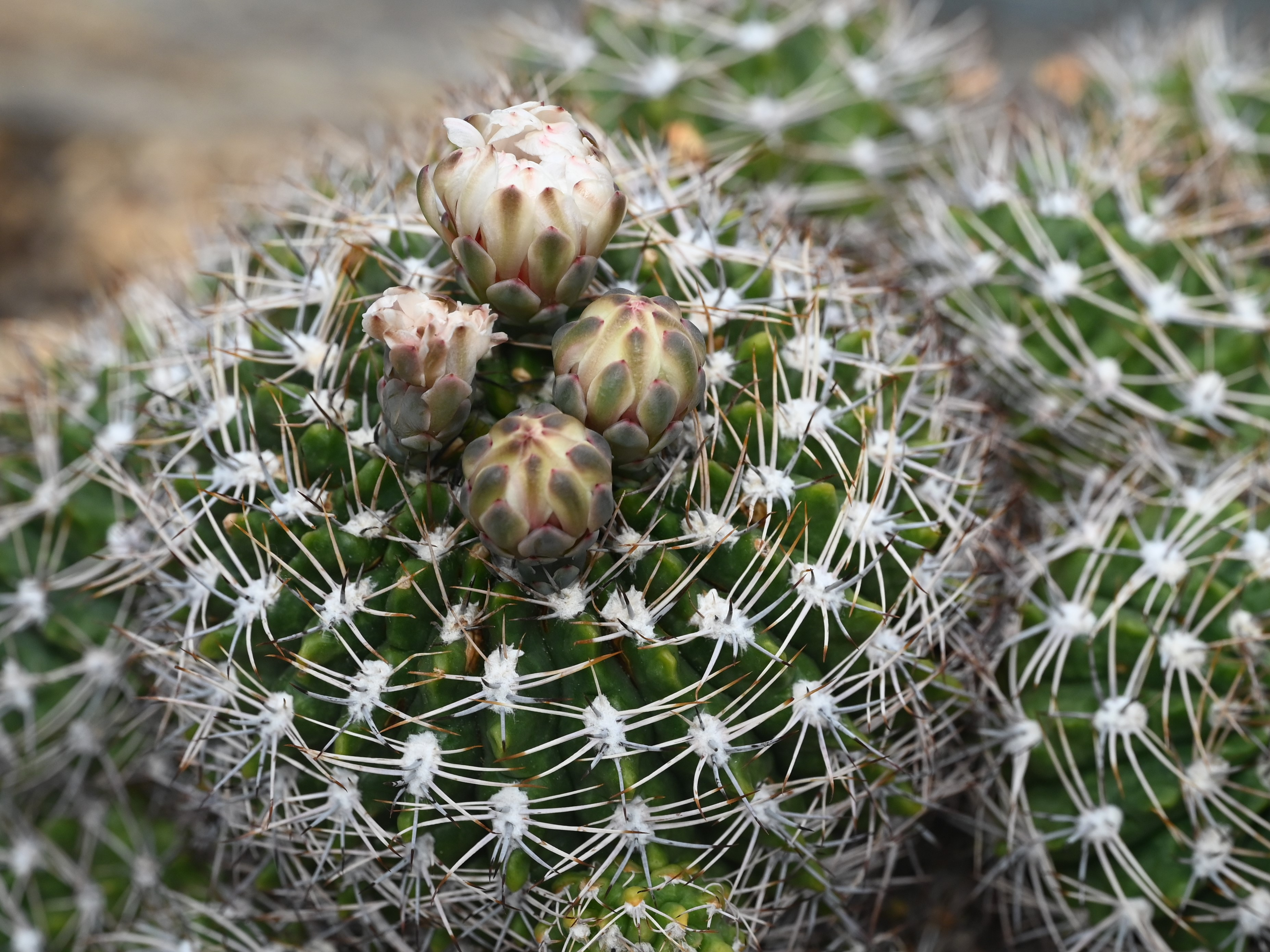
Buds

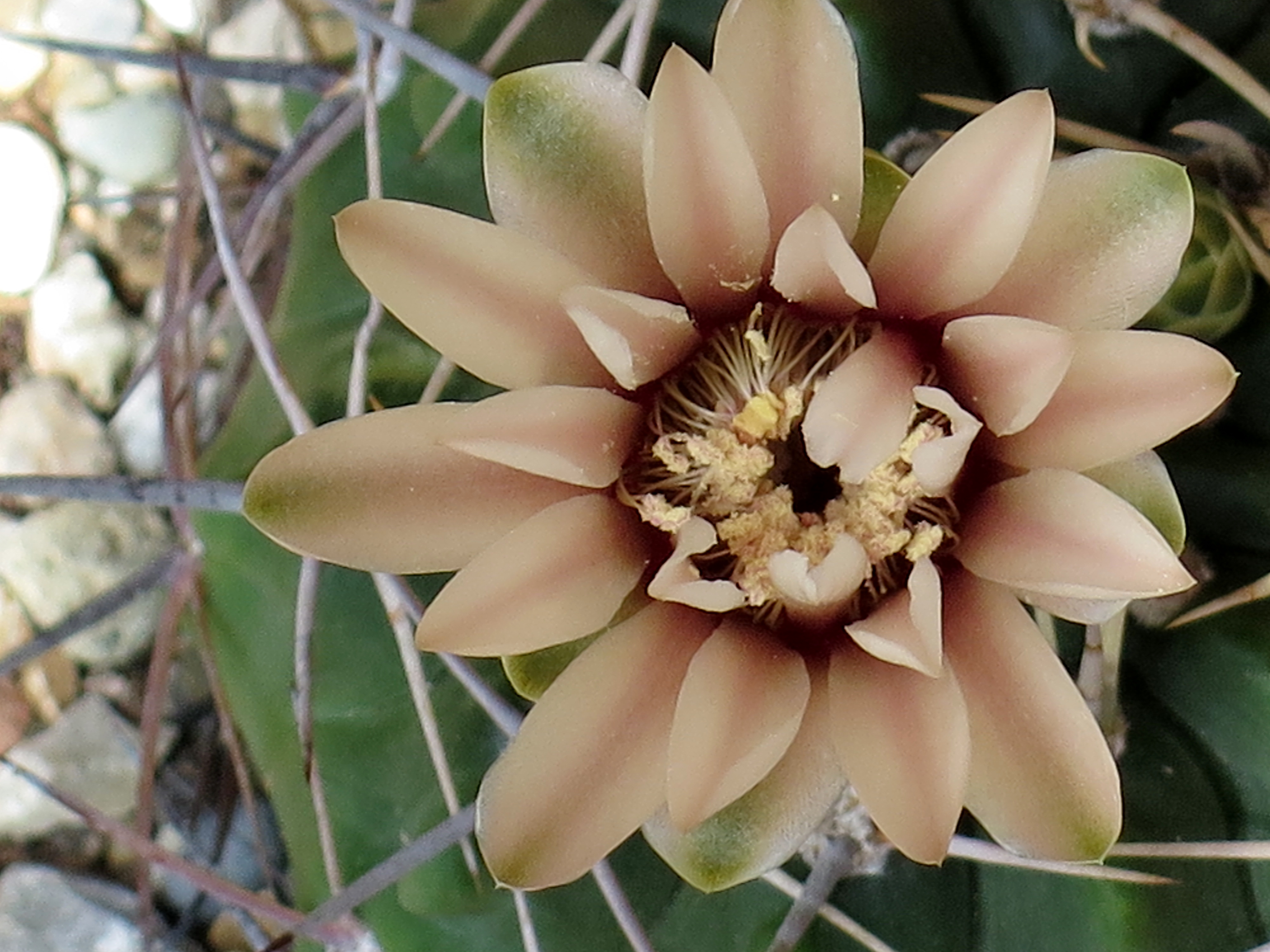
Flower

== Distribution ==
Native to the Sierras de Córdoba in Argentina's Córdoba province, it grows in grasslands at elevations of 500 to 1500 meters.

== Taxonomy ==
First described as Echinocactus mostii by Max Gürke in 1906, the species was renamed by Nathaniel Lord Britton and Joseph Nelson Rose in 1918. Its name honors Argentine plant collector Carlos Most.
