= Leucas zeylanica =

Scientific classification
- Kingdom: Plantae
- Clade: Tracheophytes
- Clade: Angiosperms
- Clade: Eudicots
- Clade: Asterids
- Order: Lamiales
- Family: Lamiaceae
- Genus: Leucas
- Species: L. zeylanica

Binomial name
- Leucas zeylanica (L.) R.Br.

Synonyms
- Leucas bancana Miq. Phlomis zeylanica Linn. Spermacoce denticulata Walp.

Species of flowering plant

Leucas zeylanica, commonly known as Ceylon slitwort, is a small, terrestrial, herbaceous, annual, erect or sometimes tufted, hispid and aromatic plant of the subfamily Lamioideae of family Lamiaceae. It is native to tropical Asia.

== Description ==
The plant grows to a height of up to 120 cm (47 in). Stipules are absent, the taproot is white or brown, and the stem is quadrangular. Sub-sessile leaves are linear-lanceolate or elliptic-lanceolate, 2.5–7.5 cm (0.98–2.95 in) long, not lobed or divided, blunt at the tip, obtuse, entire or cerrulate, glandular, hispid and coarsely dentate at the margins. Whorls of many flowers are bisexual, sessile or sub-sessile, usually in terminal whorls 1–2 cm (0.39–0.79 in) in diameter, grouped together in an axillary, corolla white in color and 2 cm long. Calyx is 5–7 mm (0.20–0.28 in) long, and obliquely turbinate, with minute teeth, apex acute, base acute, pinnately veined, erect or spreading horizontally. It is reproduced by seed and pollinated by bees moths and flies. Leucas belongs to the subfamily Lamioideae, and is closely related to the small genera Acrotome and Leonotis.

== Habitat ==
Plant occurs in various habitats, a weed of sunny dry localities, often on sandy soils, paddy dams, waste places, open grasslands, road-sides from the lowland up to 1,700 m (5,600 ft) in altitude. It is widely distributed throughout Southeast Asia, but is rather rare in East Asia.

== Constituents ==
A decoction of the herb prepared by boiling with a soda solution emits a strong odor; when condensed, the vapor yields ammonia and a volatile alkaloid in the distillate.

== Uses ==
=== Culinary ===
The whole herb has a bitter taste, but is still used as flavoring or potherb.

=== Traditional medicine ===
The indigenous tribes in the Satpuda region of Dhule and Jalgaon districts of Maharashtra use L. zeylanicain for fever, jaundice, and for scorpion and snake bites.

=== Agricultural ===
Many species in the genus Leucas are becoming serious weeds in rice fields, sugarcane, and banana plantations.

=== Cultural ===
The flower of Thumba plant is the central part of Onam festival in Kerala. The tiny flower of the plant is very important for laying Pookkalam.

== Essential oil ==
Leucas zeylanica yields a small amount of essential oil on distillation. The major components are oleic acid, hexadecanoic acid, 1-octen-3-ol, and caryophyllene. It has the ability to inhibit of test bacterial growth, especially Escherichia coli and Salmonella enteritidis.

== Research ==
In a study of 32 plants species collected from serpentine (ultramafic) soils in Sri Lanka and screened for antimicrobial properties, L. zeylanica showed photo-mediated activity against Staphylococcus aureus and Bacillus subtilis. L. zeylanica showed population-level variation in photoactivity. Study suggests plants from serpentine environments may have alterered antimicrobial activities compared to non-serpentine environments, and that attention is needed in deciding on the substrate and habitat when collecting plants to test for antimicrobial properties.
