= Leucas penduliflora =

Conservation status
- Vulnerable (IUCN 3.1)

Scientific classification
- Kingdom: Plantae
- Clade: Tracheophytes
- Clade: Angiosperms
- Clade: Eudicots
- Clade: Asterids
- Order: Lamiales
- Family: Lamiaceae
- Genus: Leucas
- Species: L. penduliflora

Binomial name
- Leucas penduliflora Al-Gifri & Cortés-Burns

Species of plant

Leucas penduliflora is a species of flowering plant in the family Lamiaceae. It is endemic to the island of Socotra in Yemen. Its natural habitat is subtropical or tropical dry shrubland.
