= Leucas kishenensis =

Conservation status
- Least Concern (IUCN 3.1)

Scientific classification
- Kingdom: Plantae
- Clade: Tracheophytes
- Clade: Angiosperms
- Clade: Eudicots
- Clade: Asterids
- Order: Lamiales
- Family: Lamiaceae
- Genus: Leucas
- Species: L. kishenensis

Binomial name
- Leucas kishenensis (Radcl.-Sm.) Sebald (1980)

Synonyms
- Leucas thymoides subsp. kishenensis Radcl.-Sm. (1971)

Species of plant

Leucas kishenensis is a species of flowering plant in the family Lamiaceae. It is a shrub endemic to the Hajhir Mountains of Socotra island in Yemen, where it grows in open semi-deciduous shrubland on granite from 650 to 1,000 metres elevation.
