= Leucas hagghierensis =

Conservation status
- Vulnerable (IUCN 3.1)

Scientific classification
- Kingdom: Plantae
- Clade: Tracheophytes
- Clade: Angiosperms
- Clade: Eudicots
- Clade: Asterids
- Order: Lamiales
- Family: Lamiaceae
- Genus: Leucas
- Species: L. hagghierensis

Binomial name
- Leucas hagghierensis Al-Gifri & Cortés-Burns

Species of plant

Leucas hagghierensis is a species of flowering plant in the family Lamiaceae. It endemic to the central and western Hajhir Mountains on the island of Socotra in Yemen. Its natural habitat is dense submontane semi-deciduous thicket around granite pinnacles from 1,050 to 1,500 metres elevation.

It is the largest species of Leucas native to Socotra.
