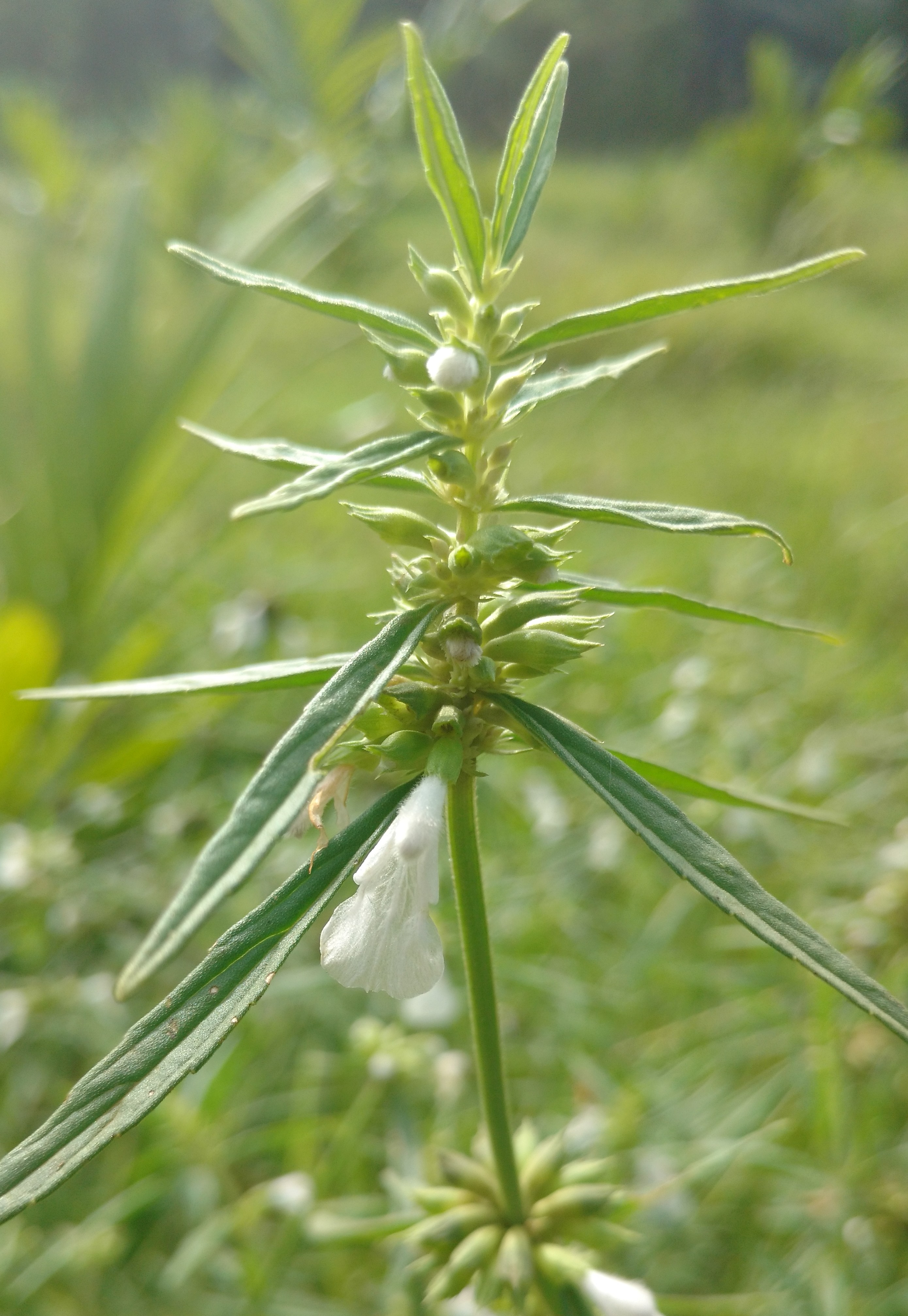

Scientific classification
- Kingdom: Plantae
- Clade: Tracheophytes
- Clade: Angiosperms
- Clade: Eudicots
- Clade: Asterids
- Order: Lamiales
- Family: Lamiaceae
- Genus: Leucas
- Species: L. aspera

Binomial name
- Leucas aspera (Willd.) Link

= Leucas aspera =

Species of flowering plant

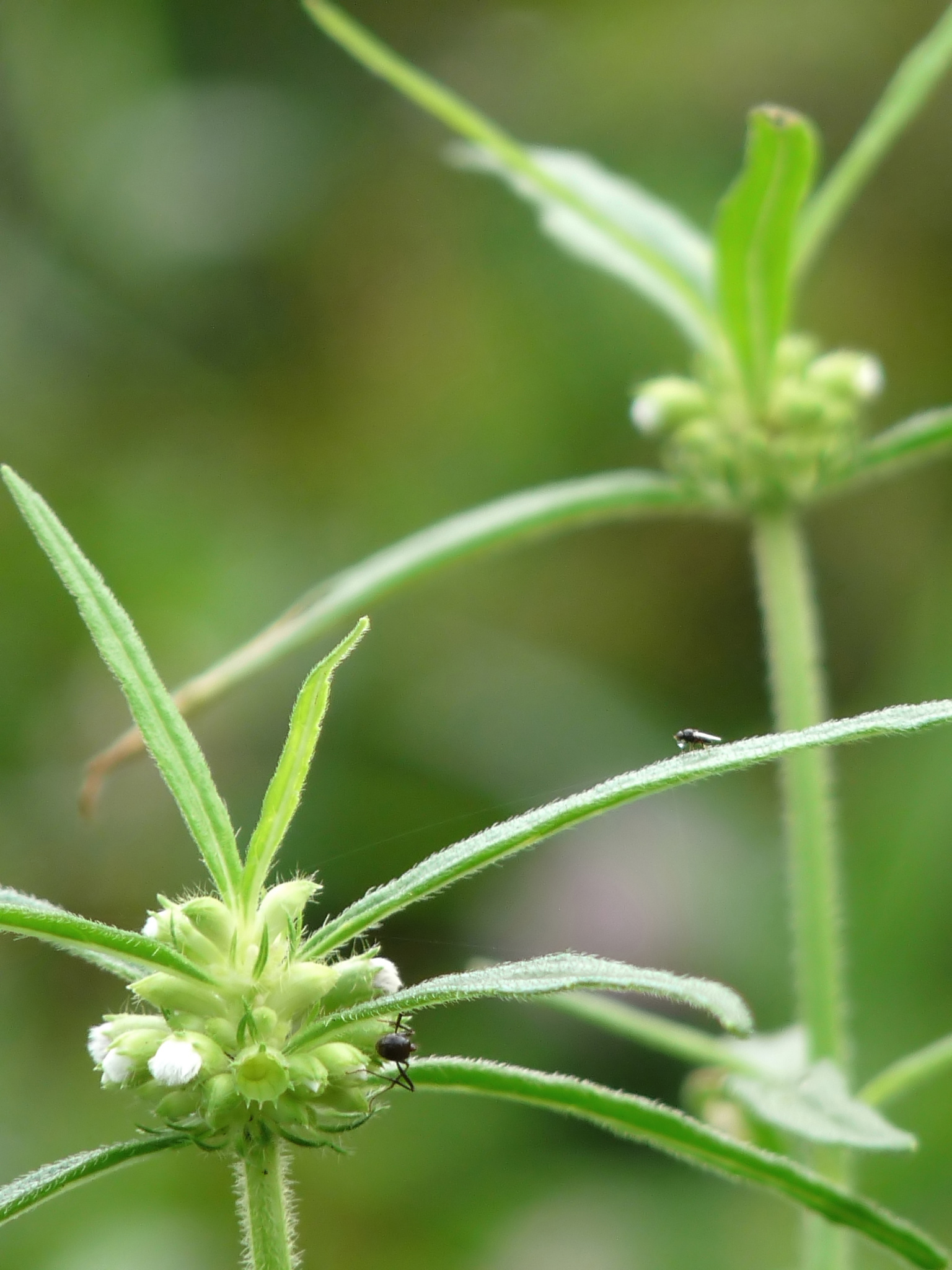
Leucas aspera in Kerala

Leucas aspera is a plant species within the genus Leucas and the family Lamiaceae. Although the species has many different common names depending on the region in which it is located, it is most commonly known as Thumbai or Thumba. Found throughout India, it is known for its various uses in the fields of medicine and agriculture.

== Distribution ==
Leucas aspera is commonly found throughout India and the Philippines as well as the plains of Mauritius, Reunion Island and Java. In India and the Philippines, it is a very common weed.

== Habitat and ecology ==
Leucas aspera is typically found in dry, open, sandy soil and is abundant in areas with waste.

== Morphology and anatomy ==
It is an annual herb or undershrub that can reach heights of 15–60 cm (6–24 in).

- Leaves

Opposite, subsessile or short petioled, linear or narrowly oblong- lanceolate, entire or distantly crenate, obtuse, narrowed at the base. They can reach up to lengths of 8 cm (3.1 in), and be 1.25 cm (0.49 in) broad. The length of petioles is typically 2.5–6 mm (0.098–0.236 in) long. The leaves epidermis is covered in a thick waxy cuticle and is traversed with stomata.

- Stem

The stem is quadrangular, much branched, hispid or scabrid and contains a wide stele. The epidermis of the stem is covered in a thick waxy cuticle and contains few traversed stomata. Typically in younger stems the xylem tissue is radially organized and the parenchymatous pholem tissue is very narrow. As the stem ages the pholem tissue widens and can be found on both sides of the radial xylem tissue.

- Roots

The roots of Leucas aspera contains epidermal cells which are very narrow and closely packed together. The cell walls of the epidermal cells are very thin, flattened and straight. The parenchyma in the cortex contains thick walls. The parenchyma cells are polygonally shaped and contain a large amount of starch grains. The cambium separates the phloem and xylem, which are globose to subglobose.

== Flowers and fruit ==
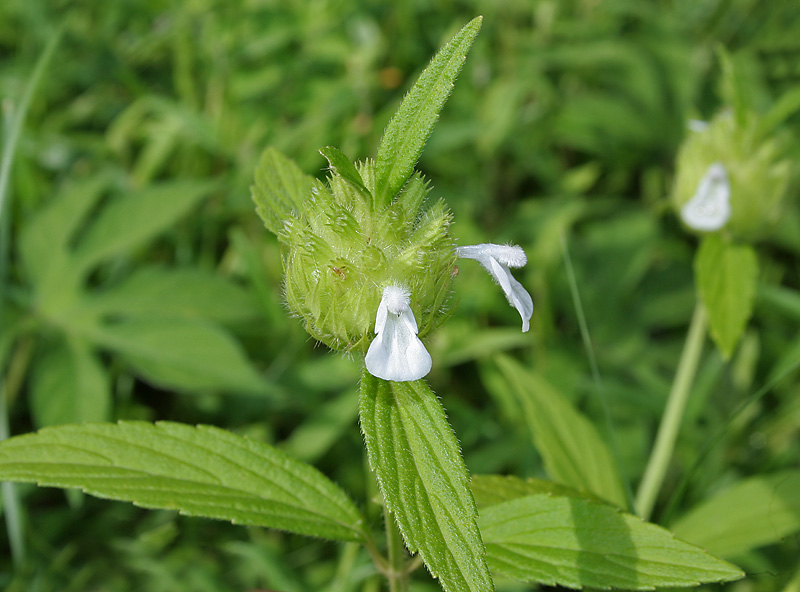
Flower of Leucas aspera, Hyderabad, India

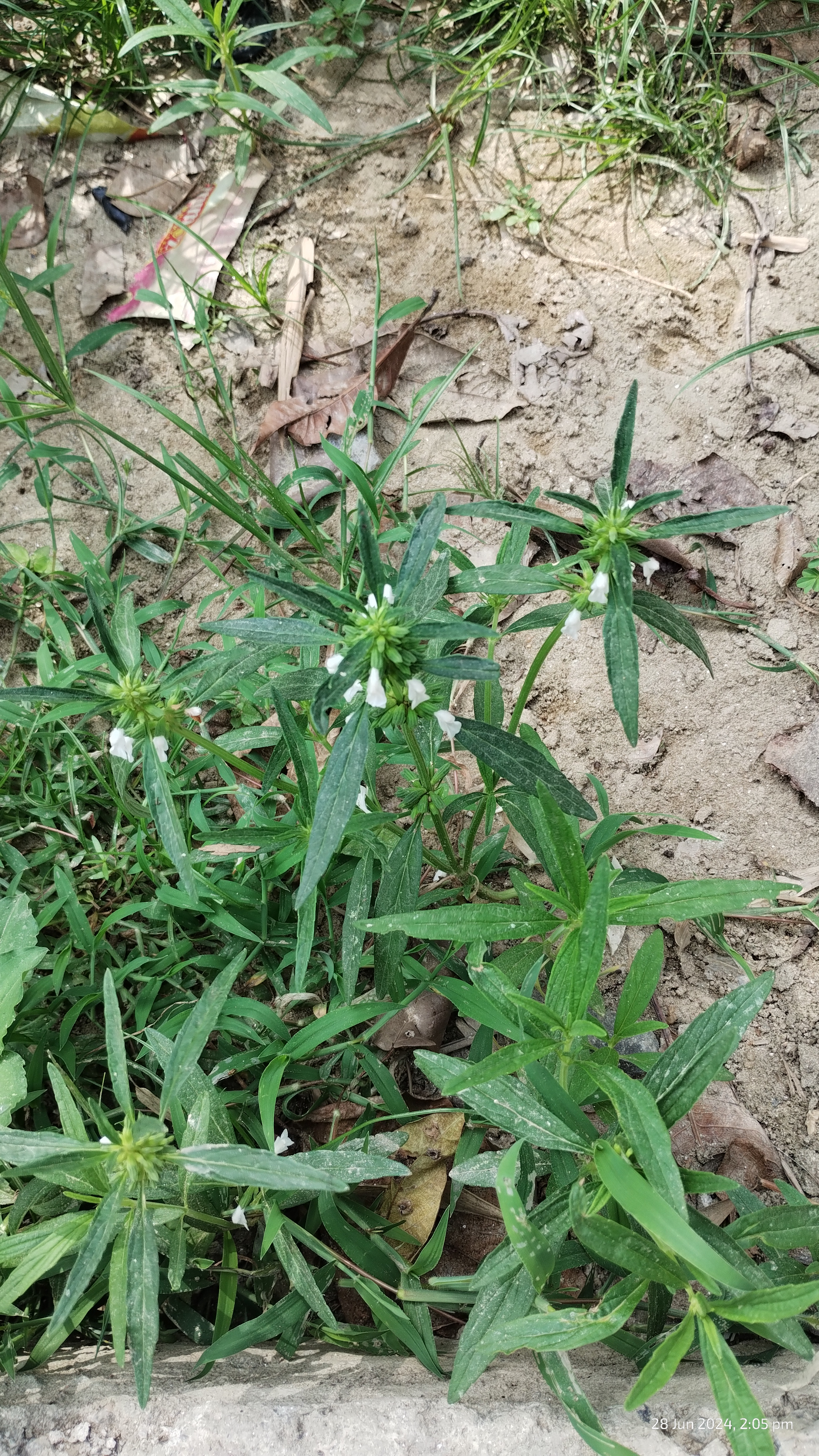
Leucas aspera in Katihar, Bihar

- Inflorescence

Verticillaster, flowers white, small, and directly attached to the base without a peduncle or stalk. The flowers are held together in auxiliary whorls or dense terminals. They contain 6 mm long bracts equaling the calyx that are bristle-tipped, linear, acute and are "ciliate with long slender hairs".

. Flower Complete, bisexual, irregular, zygomorphic, hypogynous, pentamerous, white.

Calyx
Sepals 5, gomosepalous, 10 nerved, tubular, curved,6-10 toothed, contracted at the mouth, glabrous below, ribbed and scabrid above; mouth oblique, produced on the upper side; teeth short, triangular, spinulose, ciliate, the upper one is the longest and 8–13 mm (0.31–0.51 in) in length.

- Corolla

Petals 5, gamopetalous, bilabiate; tube annulate; lower lip 3 fid, spreding, mid lobe large; upper lip 2 fid, erect, concave, villous outside, white. The corolla of Leucas aspera is 1 cm (0.39 in) in length and the tube is 5 mm (0.20 in) in length. It is annulate in the middle portion and pubescent on the upper region. The corolla is "densely white-woolly", upper lip is approximately 3 mm (0.12 in) in length and the lower lip is approximately 6 mm (0.24 in) in length. The middle lobe is rounded, obviate and the lateral lobes are subacute and small in size.
Androecium- Stamens 4, epipetalous, didynamous, ascending, the upper pair shorter; anthers connivent, cells divericate, ultimately confluent.
Gynoecium- Carples 2, syncarpous, ovary superior, 2 celled but at maturity four celled due to the formation of septum, axile placentation, 1 ovule in each chamber; style gynobasic, long; stigma bifid subulate, upper lobe minute or obsolete.

- Fruit

The fruit of L. aspera is 2.5 mm (0.098 in) long. They are nutlets that are brown, smooth and oblong in shape. The outer portion of the fruit is rounded while the inner portion is angular.

== Usage ==
=== Food ===
It is a herb used in food to provide fragrance to food.

=== Traditional medicine ===
Leucas aspera is reported to have antifungal, prostaglandin inhibitory, antioxidant, antimicrobial, antinociceptive and cytotoxic activities. Leucas aspera is used in the traditional medicine of the Philippines to treat snake bites. It is also an antipyretic, it is a herb that has the ability to help reduce fevers. In some forms of traditional medicine, the steam formed by crushing the Samoolam (the plant's flowers, seeds, roots, berries, bark or leaves), can be inhaled. The juice of the flowers can also be used for intestinal worm infections in children.

=== Other uses ===
Leucas aspera is used commonly as an insecticide. In addition the plant also has been used in witchcraft.
