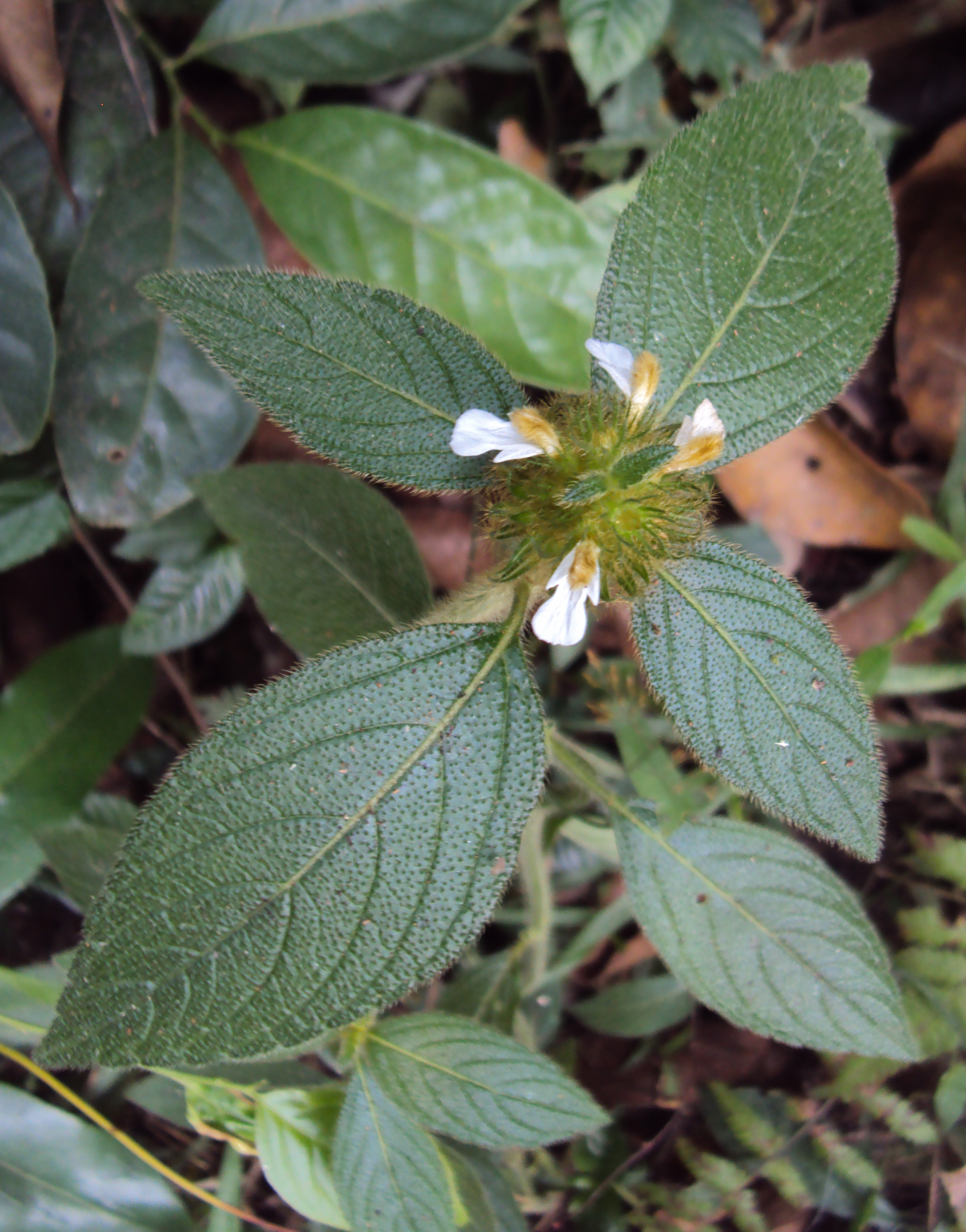
- Leucas ciliata

Scientific classification
- Kingdom: Plantae
- Clade: Tracheophytes
- Clade: Angiosperms
- Clade: Eudicots
- Clade: Asterids
- Order: Lamiales
- Family: Lamiaceae
- Subfamily: Lamioideae
- Genus: Leucas; R.Br.

Species
- See text

Synonyms
- Hemistemma Rchb.; Hemistoma Ehrenb. ex Benth.; Lasiocorys Benth.; Blandina Raf.; Elbunis Raf.; Eneodon Raf.; Heptrilis Raf.; Hetrepta Raf.; Isodeca Raf.; Leucasia Raf.; Physoleucas Jaub. & Spach

= Leucas =

Genus of plants

Leucas is a genus of plants in the family Lamiaceae, first described by Robert Brown in 1810. It contains over 200 species, widespread over much of Africa, and southern and eastern Asia (Iran, India, China, Japan, Indonesia, etc.) with a few species in Queensland and on various islands in the Indian Ocean.

== Species ==
As of March 2014 The Plant List recognises 133 accepted species (including infraspecific names):

- Leucas abyssinica (Benth.) Briq.
  - var. argyrophylla (Vatke) Sebald
  - var. brachycalyx (Chiov.) Lanza
- Leucas aequistylosa Sebald
- Leucas aggerestris (Wild) Sebald
- Leucas alba (Forssk.) Sebald
- Leucas alluaudii Sacteux
- Leucas anandaraoana Umam.Rao & P.Daniel
- Leucas angularis Benth.
- Leucas angustissima Sedgw.
- Leucas argentea Gürke
  - var. neumannii (Gürke) Sebald
- Leucas aspera (Willd.) Link
- Leucas bakeri Hiern
- Leucas beddomei (Hook.f.) Sunojk. & P.Mathew
- Leucas biflora (Vahl) Sm.
- Leucas bracteosa Gürke
- Leucas calostachys Oliv.
  - var. schweinfurthii (Gürke) Sebald
- Leucas capensis (Benth.) Engl.
- Leucas cephalantha Baker
- Leucas cephalotes (Roth) Spreng.
- Leucas chinensis (Retz.) Sm.
  - f. riukiuensis (Ohwi) T.Yamaz.
- Leucas ciliata Benth.
- Leucas clarkei Hook.f.
- Leucas collettii Prain
- Leucas cuneifolia Baker
- Leucas decemdentata (Willd.) Sm.
  - var. angustifolia (Wall. ex Benth.) V.Singh
  - var. sebastiana (Subba Rao & Kumari) V.Singh
- Leucas deflexa Hook.f.
  - var. biglomerulata (Lebrun & Touss.) Sebald
  - var. deflexa
  - var. kondowensis (Baker) Sebald
- Leucas densiflora Vatke
- Leucas deodikarii Billmore & Hemadri
- Leucas dhofarensis Hedge & Sebald
- Leucas diffusa Benth.
- Leucas discolor Sebald
- Leucas droupadiae Akash
- Leucas ebracteata Peyr.
- Leucas ellipticifolia (Sebald) Bramley
- Leucas eriostoma Hook.f.
  - var. lanata Hook.f.
- Leucas flagellifera (Balf.f.) Gürke
- Leucas fulvipila Bramley
- Leucas glabrata (Vahl) Sm.
- Leucas grandis Vatke
- Leucas hagghierensis Al-Gifri & Cortés-Burns
- Leucas helferi Hook.f.
- Leucas helianthemifolia Desf.
- Leucas helicterifolia Haines
- Leucas hephaestis (Wild) Sebald
- Leucas hirta (B.Heyne ex Roth) Spreng.
- Leucas hirundinaris Sebald
- Leucas hyssopifolia Benth.
- Leucas inflata Benth.
- Leucas jamesii Baker
- Leucas kishenensis (Radcl.-Sm.) Sebald
- Leucas lamiifolia Desf.
- Leucas lanata Benth.
- Leucas lanceifolia Desf.
- Leucas lavandulifolia Sm.
- Leucas longifolia Benth.
- Leucas macrantha Blatt. & Hallb.
- Leucas manipurensis N.P.Singh
- Leucas marrubioides Desf.
- Leucas martinicensis (Jacq.) R.Br.
- Leucas masaiensis Oliv.
  - var. tricrenata (Bullock) Sebald
  - var. venulosa (Baker) Sebald
- Leucas mathewiana Sunojk.
- Leucas menthifolia Baker
  - var. fulva (Robyns & Lebrun) Sebald
  - var. menthifolia
- Leucas milanjiana Gürke
- Leucas minimifolia Chiov.
- Leucas minutiflora Bramley
- Leucas montana (Roth) Spreng.
- Leucas mukerjiana Subba Rao & Kumari
- Leucas mwingensis Sebald
- Leucas nepetifolia Benth.
- Leucas neufliseana Courbai
- Leucas neuflizeana Courbon
- Leucas nubica Benth.
- Leucas nutans (Roth) Spreng.
- Leucas nyassae Gürke
  - var. velutina (C.H.Wright ex Baker) Sebald
- Leucas oligocephala Hook.f.
  - var. bowalensis (A.Chev.) Sebald
  - var. oligocephala
- Leucas ovata Benth.
- Leucas pearsonii Sebald
- Leucas pechuelii (Kuntze) Baker
- Leucas penduliflora Al-Gifri & Cortés-Burns
- Leucas pilosa Benth.
- Leucas prostrata (Hook.f.) Gamble
- Leucas pseudoglabrata Bramley
- Leucas pubescens Benth.
- Leucas rosmarinifolia Benth.
- Leucas royleoides (Benth.) Gürke
- Leucas ruspoliana Gürke
- Leucas samhaensis Cortés-Burns & A.G.Mill.
- Leucas sebaldiana Sunojk.
- Leucas sexdentata Skan
- Leucas sivadasaniana Sunojk.
- Leucas somalensis Vatke
- Leucas songeana Sebald
- Leucas spiculifera (Balf.f.) Guerke
- Leucas spiculifolia (Balf.f.) Gürke
- Leucas stachydiformis (Benth.) Hochst. ex Briq.
- Leucas stelligera Wall. ex Benth.
- Leucas stormsii Gürke
- Leucas stricta Benth.
- Leucas subarcuata Sebald
- Leucas suffruticosa Benth.
- Leucas teres Benth.
- Leucas tettensis Vatke
- Leucas tomentosa Gürke
- Leucas tsavoensis Sebald
- Leucas urticifolia (Vahl) Sm.
- Leucas urundensis Robyns & Lebrun
- Leucas usagarensis Gürke
- Leucas vestita Benth.
  - var. angustifolia Hook.f.
  - var. oblongifolia Hook.f.
  - var. sericostoma Hook.f.
- Leucas virgata Balf.f.
- Leucas volkensii Gürke
- Leucas welwitschii Gürke
- Leucas wightiana Wall. ex Benth.
- Leucas wilsonii Sebald
- Leucas zeylanica (L.) W.T.Aiton
  - var. walkeri (Benth.) Hook.f.

A new species, Leucas sahyadriensis Sunojk., has recently been described and is endemic to the Western Ghats of southern India.
