= Leucas samhaensis =

Conservation status
- Vulnerable (IUCN 3.1)

Scientific classification
- Kingdom: Plantae
- Clade: Tracheophytes
- Clade: Angiosperms
- Clade: Eudicots
- Clade: Asterids
- Order: Lamiales
- Family: Lamiaceae
- Genus: Leucas
- Species: L. samhaensis

Binomial name
- Leucas samhaensis Cortés-Burns & A.G.Mill.

Species of flowering plant

Leucas samhaensis is a species of flowering plant in the family Lamiaceae. It is endemic to the island of Samhah in Yemen's Socotra Archipelago. Its natural habitat is subtropical or tropical dry shrubland.
