= Leucas cephalotes =

Scientific classification
- Kingdom: Plantae
- Clade: Tracheophytes
- Clade: Angiosperms
- Clade: Eudicots
- Clade: Asterids
- Order: Lamiales
- Family: Lamiaceae
- Genus: Leucas
- Species: L. cephalotes

Binomial name
- Leucas cephalotes (Roth) Spreng.

Species of flowering plant

Leucas cephalotes is a flowering annual herb which is a common weed that also has uses as an edible vegetable and herbal remedy. It has many common names, including Dharampusp, guma, dronpushpi or drona puspi, and tou xu bai rong cao. It is a common plant across Asia from China to the Indian subcontinent.

Leucas cephalotes springs up in cultivated fields as a weed, especially after a period of rain. It is collected for use as a leafy vegetable in rural areas. It is cultivated itself for its medicinal uses and is readily available in markets. One of the plant's most common historical uses has been as a treatment for snakebite. It is also steeped in water which is then used for bathing and for washing livestock.

Two chemical compounds found in the plant are labellenic acid and beta-Sitosterol. As well, the plant contains oleanolic acid, 7-oxositosterol, 7-oxostigmasterol, 7alpha-hydroxy stigmasterol, stigmasterol, 5-hydroxy-7,4'-dimethoxy flavone, pillion, gonzalitosin I, tricin, cosmosin, apigenin-7-O-beta-D-(6-O-p-coumaryl)glucopyranoside, anisofolin A and luteolin.
