= Karl Richter (botanist) =

Austrian botanist (1855–1891)

Karl Richter (16 May 1855 in Vienna – 28 December 1891 in Vienna) was a botanist from Austria-Hungary.

From 1874 he studied botany at the University of Vienna, where he received his doctorate in 1877. After completing his studies at the university he worked as a private scholar in Vienna. His herbarium was acquired by Eugen von Halácsy, who incorporated it into his own herbarium, which was later donated to the University of Vienna.

With Max Gürke, he was co-author of Plantae Europaeae (1890–1903). In 1885 he published Die botanische Systematik und ihr Verhältniss zur Anatomie und Physiologie der Pflanzen (Botanical systematics and its relationship to the anatomy and physiology of plants).
