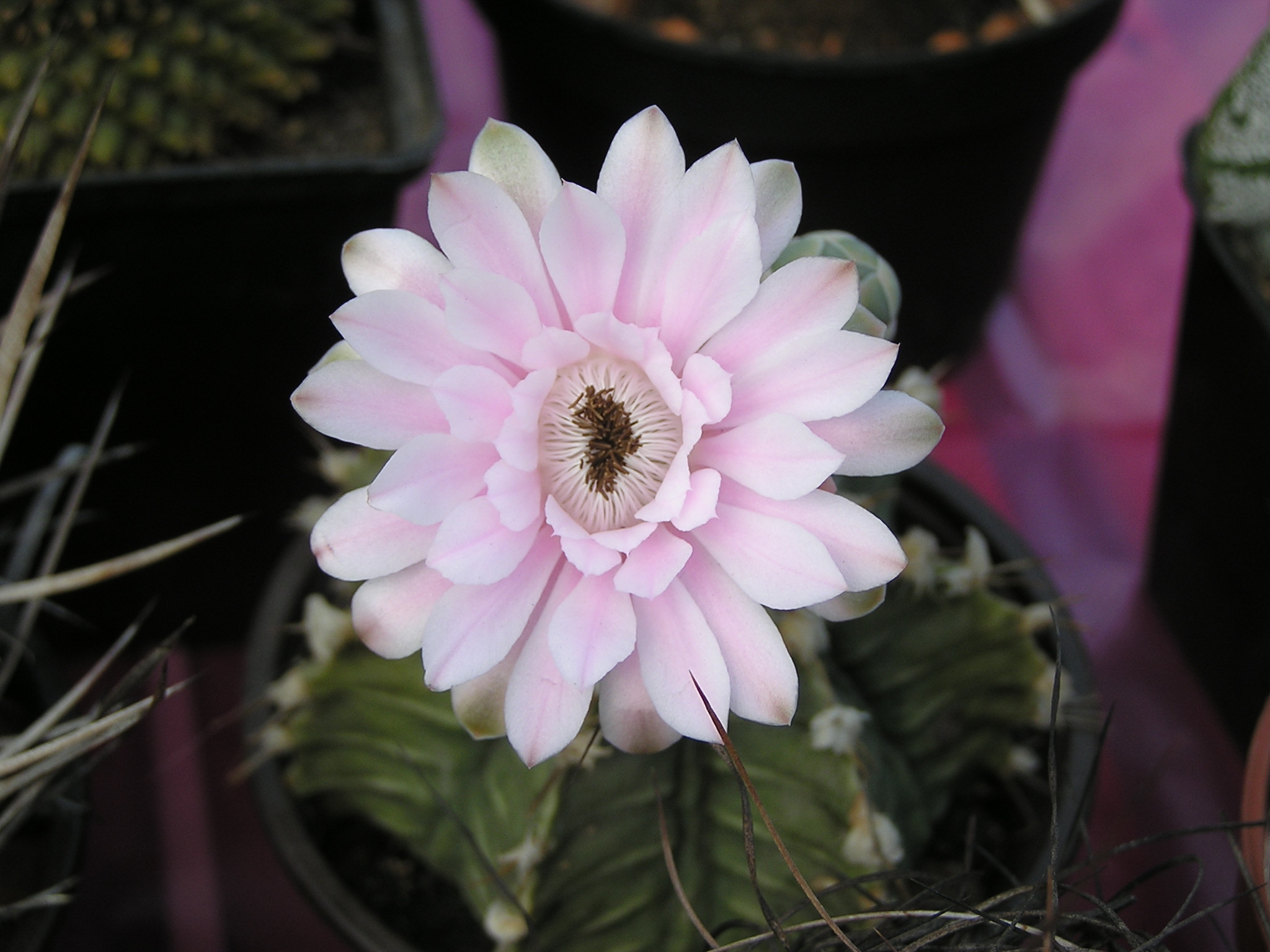

Conservation status
- Least Concern (IUCN 3.1)

Scientific classification
- Kingdom: Plantae
- Clade: Tracheophytes
- Clade: Angiosperms
- Clade: Eudicots
- Order: Caryophyllales
- Family: Cactaceae
- Subfamily: Cactoideae
- Genus: Gymnocalycium
- Species: G. stenopleurum

Binomial name
- Gymnocalycium stenopleurum F.Ritter 1979

Synonyms
- Gymnocalycium friedrichii subsp. stenopleurum (F.Ritter) Schädlich 2016; Gymnocalycium anisitsii subsp. volkeri Amerh. 2004; Gymnocalycium friedrichii (Werderm.) Pazout ex Schütz 1979; Gymnocalycium friedrichii var. angustostriatum Pazout ex Milt 2016; Gymnocalycium mihanovichii var. albiflorum Pazout 1963; Gymnocalycium mihanovichii var. angustostriatum Pazout 1962; Gymnocalycium mihanovichii var. friedrichii Werderm. 1936; Gymnocalycium mihanovichii var. piraretaense Pazout 1951

= Gymnocalycium stenopleurum =

Species of cactus

Gymnocalycium stenopleurum is a species of Gymnocalycium from Bolivia and Paraguay.

== Description ==
Gymnocalycium stenopleurum is a cactus species with gray-green, flattened, or spherical stems reaching up to 12 cm tall and 6–12 cm wide. It has 8–14 rounded ribs and 3–6 twisted, light to dark brown radial spines measuring 0.7–4 cm long, while central spines are typically absent. The plant produces white flowers 5–7 cm long and gray-green fruits up to 4 cm long and 1 cm wide.

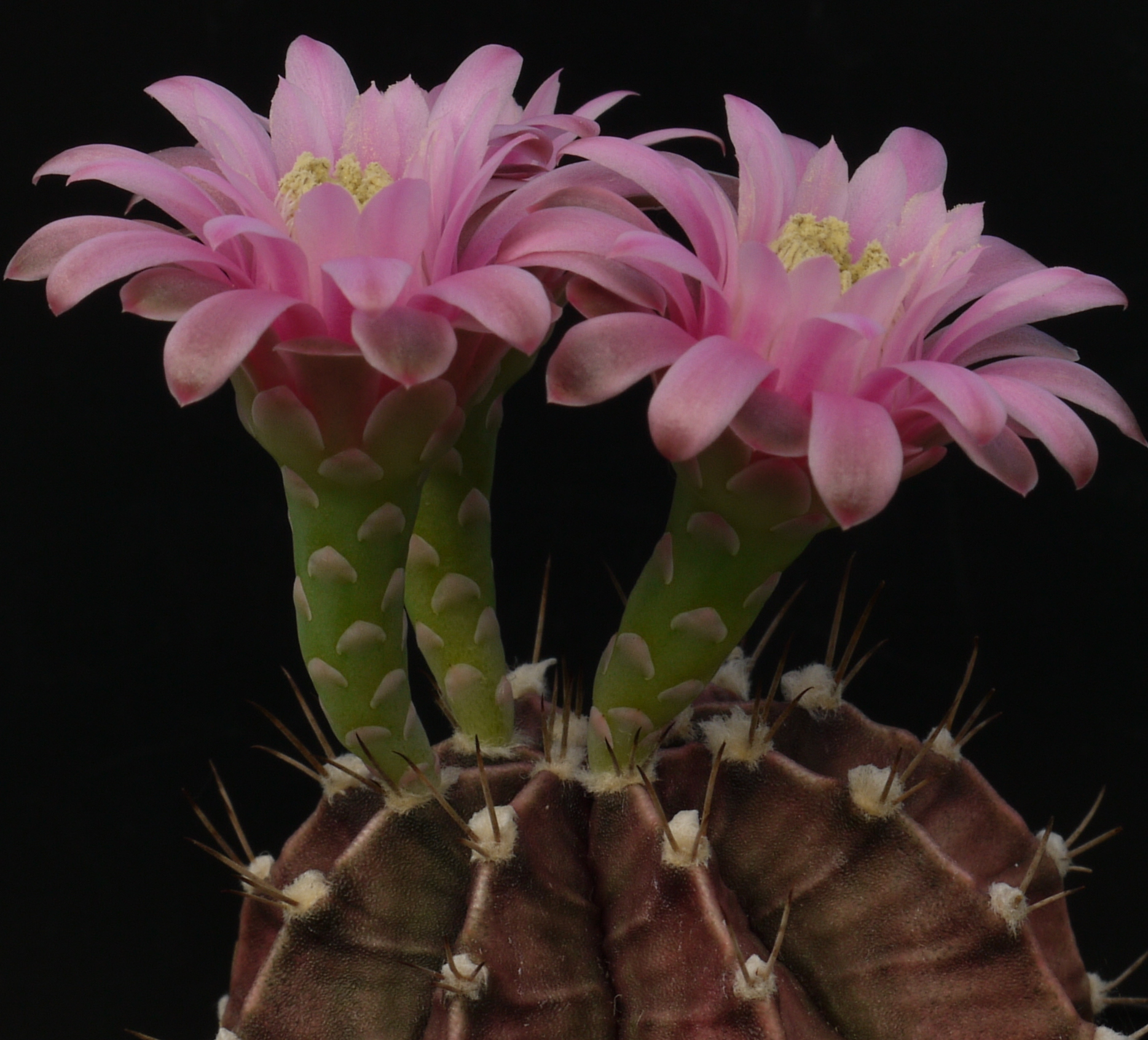
Flowers

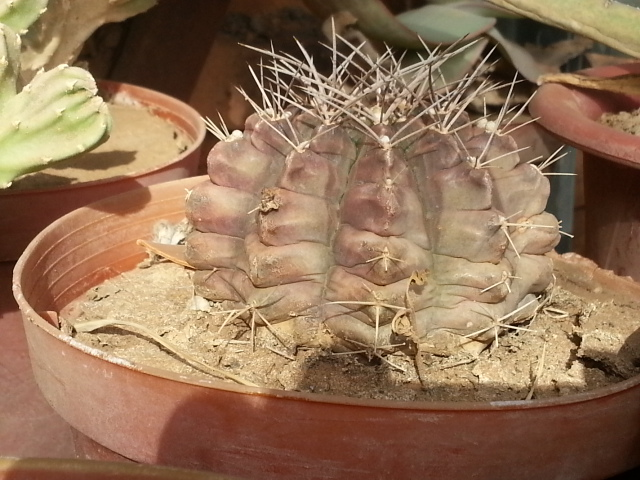
Plant

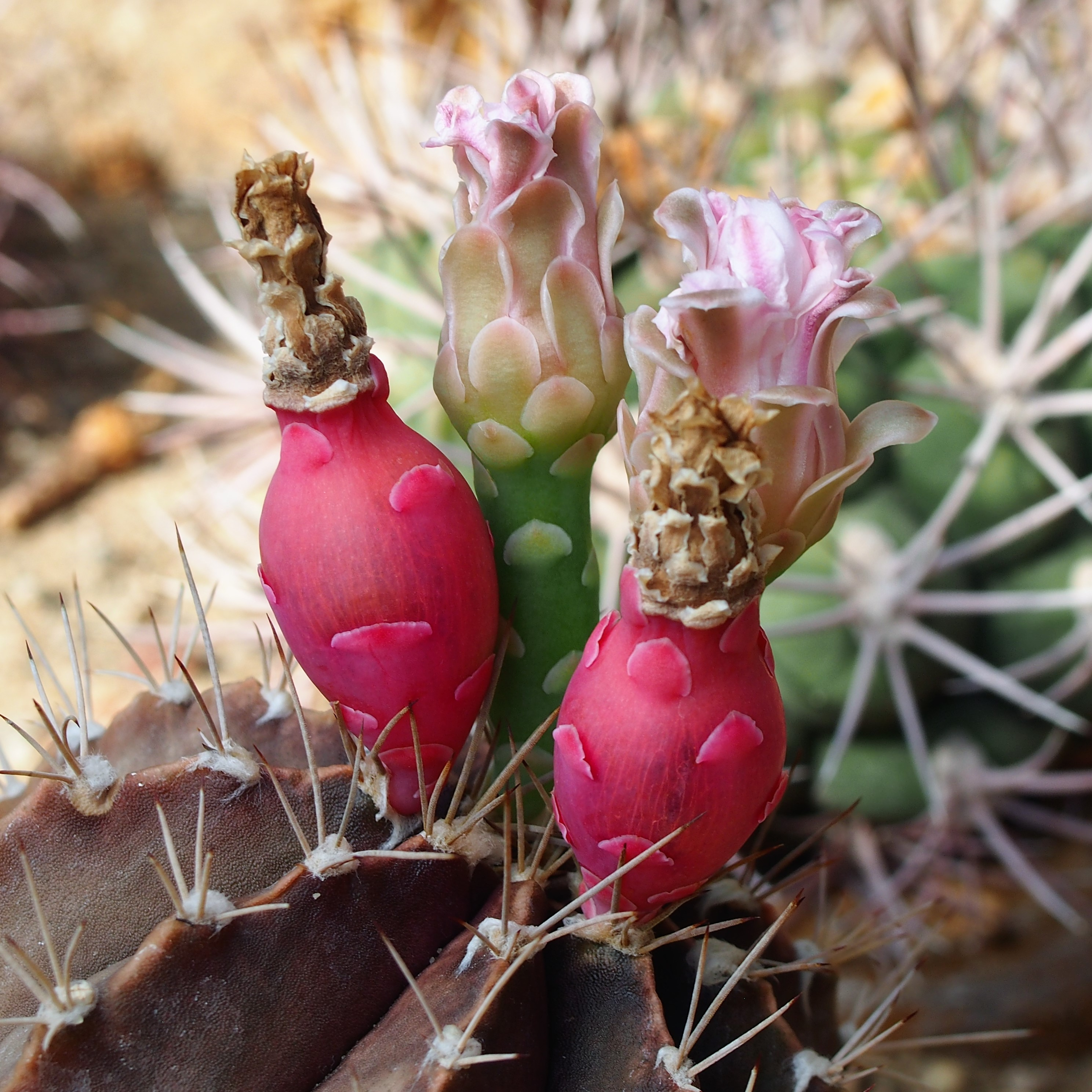
Fruit

== Distribution ==
Native to Cerro León in Paraguay's Boquerón department and eastern Bolivia, it grows at altitudes of 10 to 500 meters.

== Taxonomy ==
Friedrich Ritter first described the species in 1979.
