= Max Gürke =

German botanist

Robert Louis August Maximilian Gürke
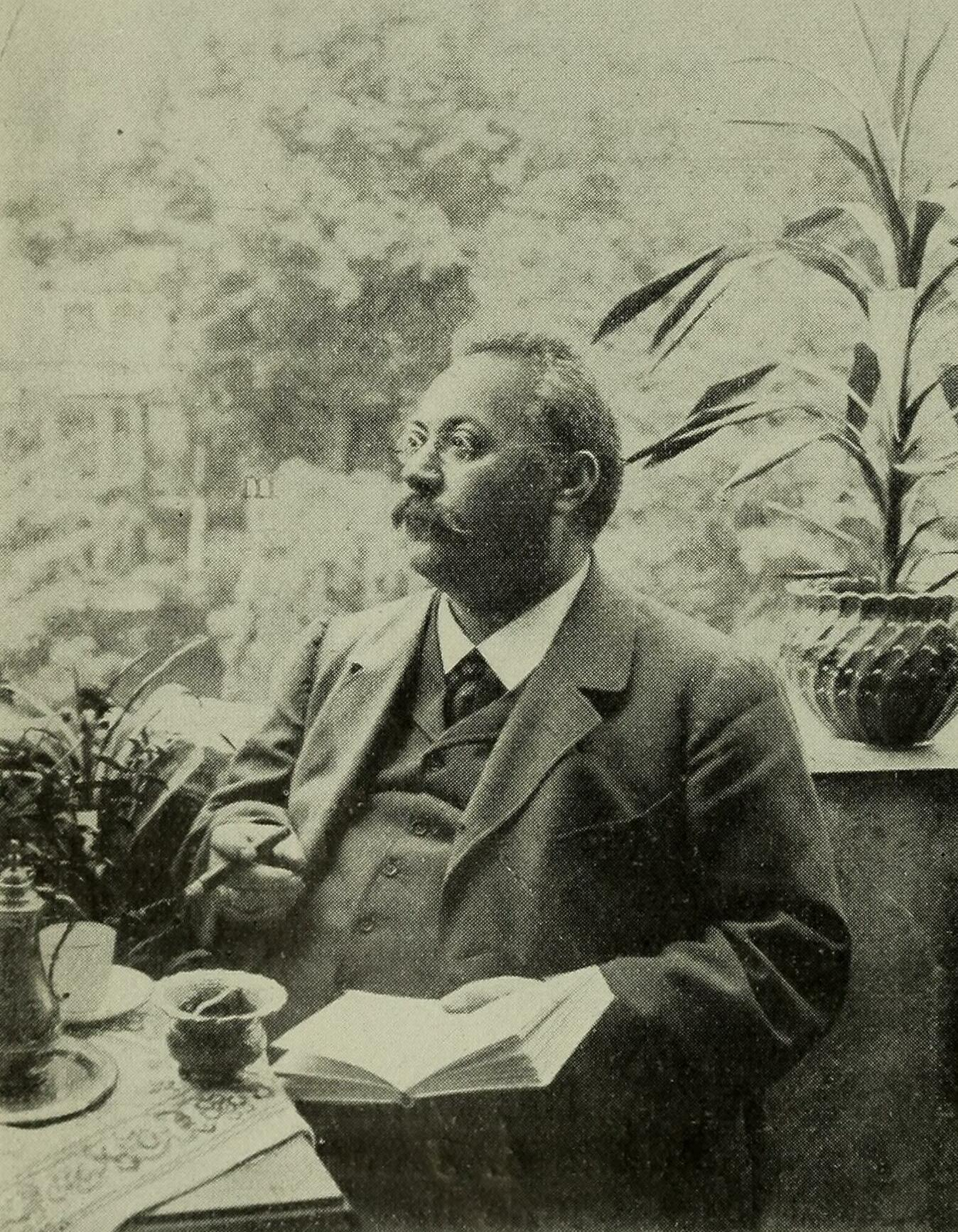
- Born: 17 November 1854; Beuthen (now Bytom Odrzański)
- Died: 16 March 1911 (aged 56); Berlin
- Other names: Max Gürke
- Scientific career
- Fields: Botany
- Author abbrev. (botany): Gürke

Robert Louis August Maximilian Gürke (17 November 1854, in Beuthen, now Bytom Odrzański – 16 March 1911, in Berlin) was a German botanist. He usually appears in literature as Max Gürke (older English-language publications sometimes give the name as "Guerke").

== Life ==
After graduating from a prestigious secondary school in Görlitz on September 1, 1875, Gürke studied natural sciences in Berlin. He later taught at a preparatory school for officer cadets in Görlitz before joining the Botanical Museum in Berlin as a scientific assistant in 1886. In 1892, he earned his doctorate in philosophy from the University of Göttingen with a dissertation on the Malvaceae family. Subsequently, Gürke was appointed assistant curator at the Berlin Museum on July 9, 1892, and then curator on January 4, 1893. He was awarded the title of Professor on April 15, 1904, and from 1905 to 1910, he served as the first chairman of the German Cactus Society.

== Selected publications ==
- Plantae Europeae, with Karl Richter (1890–1903).
