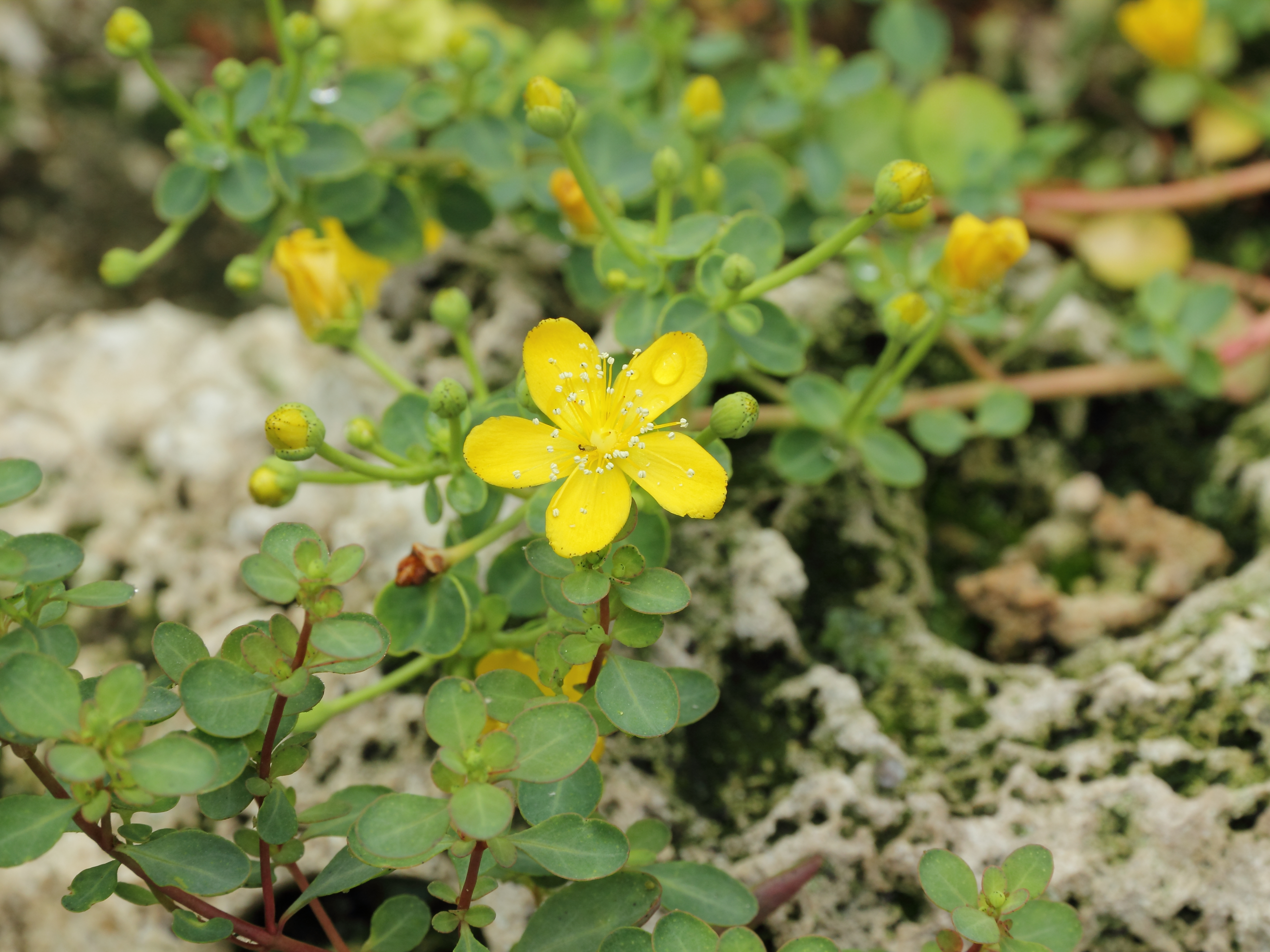

Scientific classification
- Kingdom: Plantae
- Clade: Tracheophytes
- Clade: Angiosperms
- Clade: Eudicots
- Clade: Rosids
- Order: Malpighiales
- Family: Hypericaceae
- Genus: Hypericum
- Section: Hypericum sect. Triadenoides
- Species: H. pallens

Binomial name
- Hypericum pallens Banks & Sol.

Synonyms
- Hypericum cuneatum Poir.; Hypericum cuneatum var. fragile Post; Hypericum cuneatum var. maximum Post; Hypericum cuneatum var. pallidum Post; Hypericum myrtilloides Fenzl; Hypericum tenellum Kotschy ex Boiss.

= Hypericum pallens =

Pale St. John's wort

Species of flowering plant in the St John's wort family

Hypericum pallens, commonly known as the Pale St. John's wort or Mount Lebanon St. John's wort, is a species of flowering plant in the family Hypericaceae which is found in Turkey, Lebanon, and Syria.

== Description ==
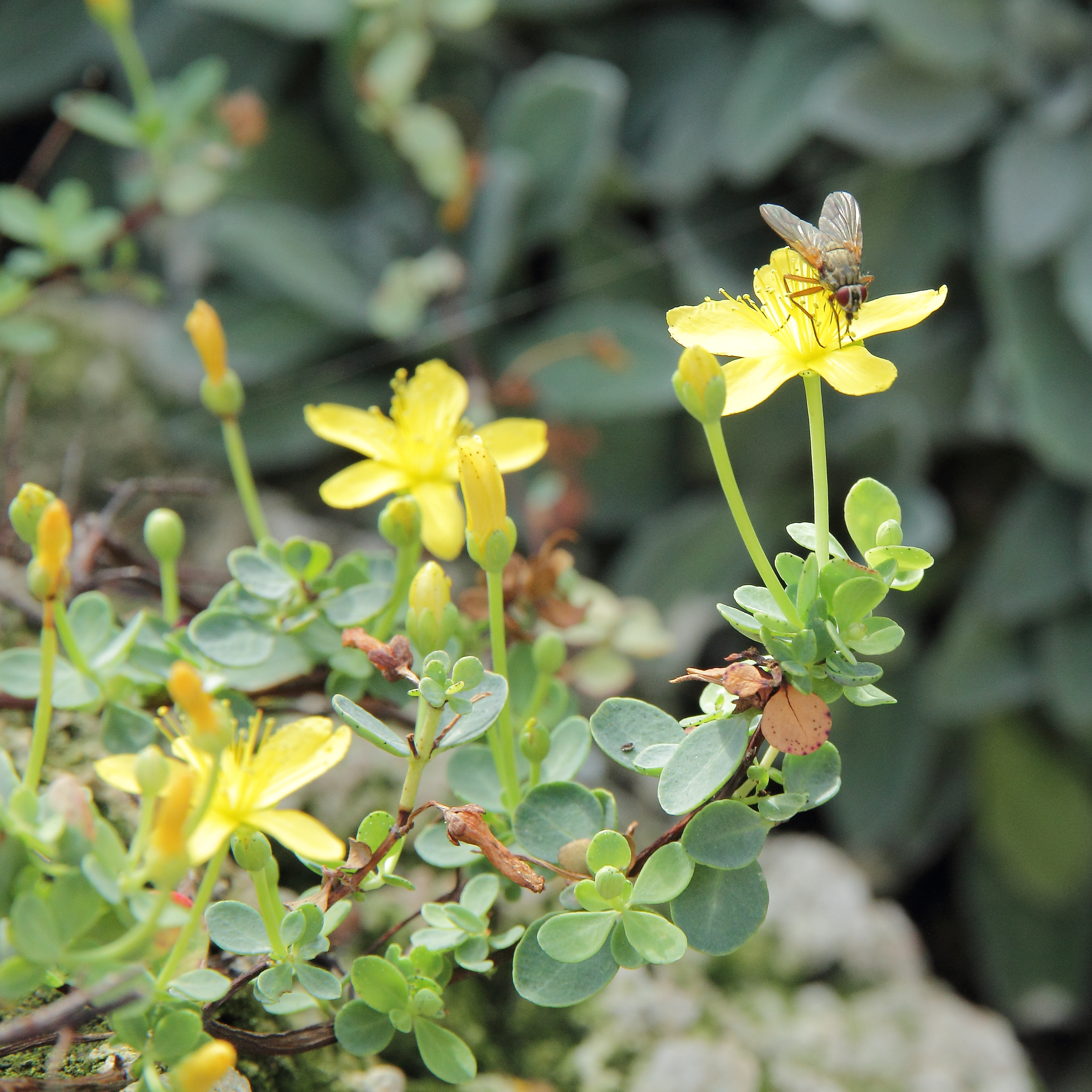

=== Similar species ===
H. pallens is similar in appearance to Hypericum ternatum, but it is less woody and more procumbent. Additionally, the range of H. pallens is to the east of H. ternatum, and their ranges do not overlap. In addition, the inflorescence of the species is also similar to the inflorescence of several species in the section Campylosporus, especially Hypericum revolutum.

== Taxonomy ==
H. pallens was first published as Hypericum cuneatum by Alfred Russel Wallace in the journal Nat. Hist. Aleppo in 1794. The species was later described as H. pallens by Joseph Banks and Daniel Solander. A variant of the species dubbed H. pallens var. maximum has been proposed, which would consist of the members of the species with much larger and broader leaves that are found near Antioch, but the subdivision of the species has not been accepted.

== Distribution and habitat ==
The species is found in Southern Turkey in Cilicia and Amanus, Syria in Latakia, and Lebanon along the coastal plain. It is found among hard limestone rocks at elevations of 50–1,700 meters (160–5,580 ft).
