= Libinhania balfourii =

Conservation status
- Least Concern (IUCN 3.1)

Scientific classification
- Kingdom: Plantae
- Clade: Tracheophytes
- Clade: Angiosperms
- Clade: Eudicots
- Clade: Asterids
- Order: Asterales
- Family: Asteraceae
- Genus: Libinhania
- Species: L. balfourii

Binomial name
- Libinhania balfourii (Vierh.) N.Kilian, Galbany, Oberpr. & A.G.Mill.

Synonyms
- Helichrysum balfourii Vierh.

Species of plant

Libinhania balfourii, synonym Helichrysum balfourii, is a species of flowering plant in the family Asteraceae. It is endemic to Socotra. Its natural habitat is subtropical or tropical dry forests.
