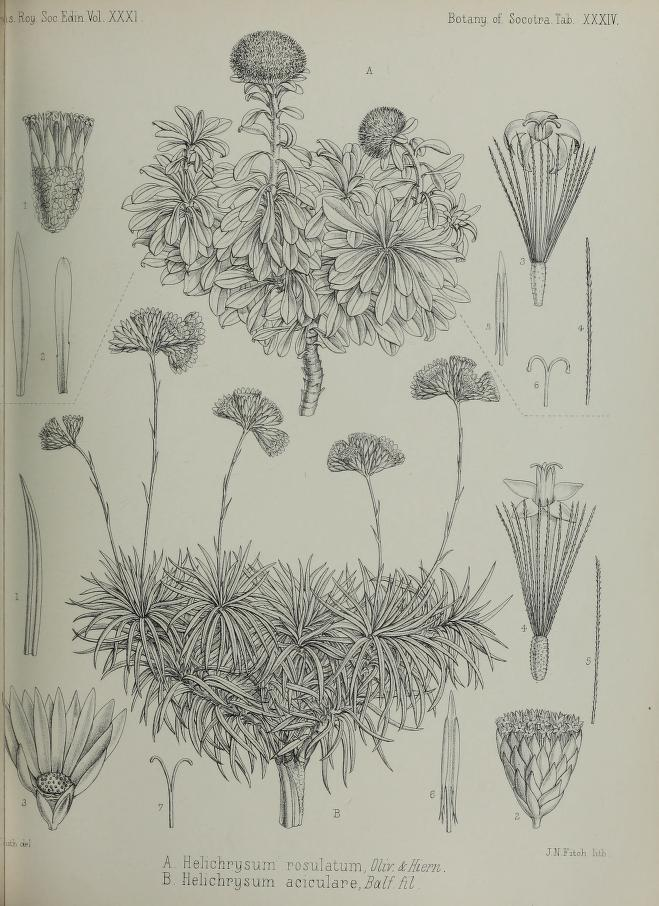

Conservation status
- Least Concern (IUCN 3.1)

Scientific classification
- Kingdom: Plantae
- Clade: Tracheophytes
- Clade: Angiosperms
- Clade: Eudicots
- Clade: Asterids
- Order: Asterales
- Family: Asteraceae
- Genus: Libinhania
- Species: L. acicularis

Binomial name
- Libinhania acicularis (Balf.f.) N.Kilian, Galbany, Oberpr. & A.G.Mill.

Synonyms
- Helichrysum aciculare Balf.f.

= Libinhania acicularis =

Species of flowering plant

Libinhania acicularis, synonym Helichrysum aciculare, is a species of flowering plant in the family Asteraceae. It lives only in Socotra. Its natural habitat is rocky areas.
