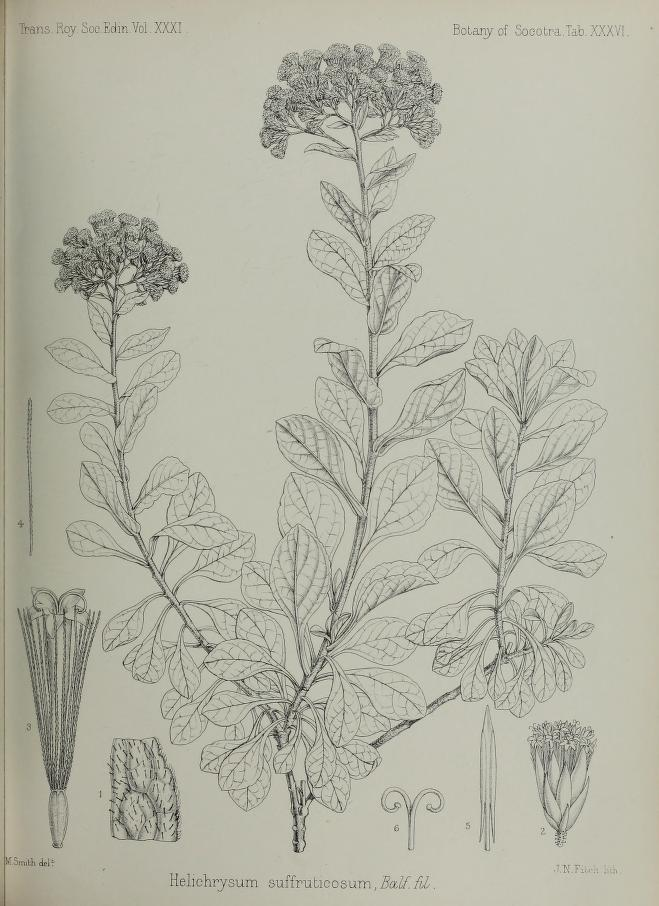

Conservation status
- Vulnerable (IUCN 3.1)

Scientific classification
- Kingdom: Plantae
- Clade: Tracheophytes
- Clade: Angiosperms
- Clade: Eudicots
- Clade: Asterids
- Order: Asterales
- Family: Asteraceae
- Genus: Libinhania
- Species: L. suffruticosa

Binomial name
- Libinhania suffruticosa (Balf.f.) N.Kilian, Galbany, Oberpr. & A.G.Mill.

Synonyms
- Helichrysum suffruticosum Balf.f.

= Libinhania suffruticosa =

Species of flowering plant

Libinhania suffruticosa, synonym Helichrysum suffruticosum, is a species of flowering plant in the family Asteraceae. It is endemic to Socotra. Its natural habitat is subtropical or tropical dry forests.
