= Libinhania pendula =

Conservation status
- Vulnerable (IUCN 3.1)

Scientific classification
- Kingdom: Plantae
- Clade: Tracheophytes
- Clade: Angiosperms
- Clade: Eudicots
- Clade: Asterids
- Order: Asterales
- Family: Asteraceae
- Genus: Libinhania
- Species: L. pendula

Binomial name
- Libinhania pendula A.G.Mill., Sommerer & N.Kilian

Species of flowering plant

Libinhania pendula is a species of flowering plant in the family Asteraceae. It is found only on Socotra, and African island which is part of Yemen. Its natural habitats are subtropical or tropical dry shrubland and rocky areas.

Provisionally referred to as "Helichrysum sp. nov. B", it was described in 2017.
