= Libinhania discolor =

Conservation status
- Data Deficient (IUCN 3.1)

Scientific classification
- Kingdom: Plantae
- Clade: Tracheophytes
- Clade: Angiosperms
- Clade: Eudicots
- Clade: Asterids
- Order: Asterales
- Family: Asteraceae
- Genus: Libinhania
- Species: L. discolor

Binomial name
- Libinhania discolor A.G.Mill., Sommerer & N.Kilian

Species of flowering plant

Libinhania discolor is a species of flowering plant in the family Asteraceae. It is found only on Socotra, an African island which is part of Yemen. Its natural habitat is rocky areas.

Provisionally referred to as "Helichrysum sp. nov. E", it was described in 2017.
