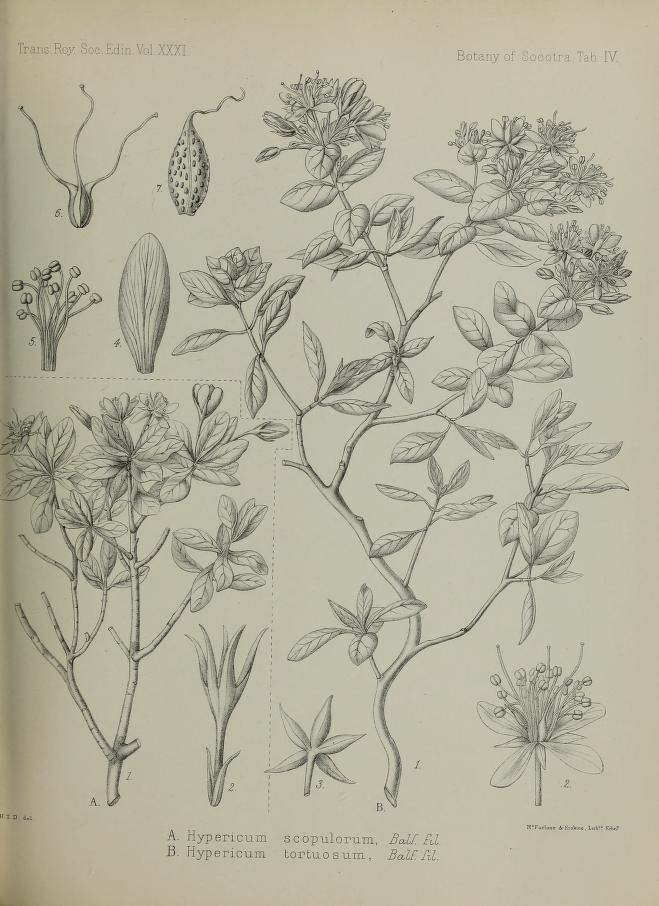

Conservation status
- Least Concern (IUCN 3.1)

Scientific classification
- Kingdom: Plantae
- Clade: Tracheophytes
- Clade: Angiosperms
- Clade: Eudicots
- Clade: Rosids
- Order: Malpighiales
- Family: Hypericaceae
- Genus: Hypericum
- Section: Hypericum sect. Triadenoides
- Species: H. scopulorum

Binomial name
- Hypericum scopulorum Balf.f.

= Hypericum scopulorum =

Species of flowering plant

Hypericum scopulorum is a species of flowering plant in the family Hypericaceae. It is endemic to Socotra, an island archipelago that is part of Yemen. It is a common plant in shrubland habitat, and it is a dominant species in some areas along with another local endemic, Libinhania rosulata.
