= Hypericum fieriense =

Conservation status
- Vulnerable (IUCN 3.1)

Scientific classification
- Kingdom: Plantae
- Clade: Tracheophytes
- Clade: Angiosperms
- Clade: Eudicots
- Clade: Rosids
- Order: Malpighiales
- Family: Hypericaceae
- Genus: Hypericum
- Section: Hypericum sect. Triadenoides
- Species: H. fieriense

Binomial name
- Hypericum fieriense N.Robson

Species of flowering plant in the St John's wort family

Hypericum fieriense is a species of flowering plant in the St. John's wort family Hypericaceae. It is endemic to Socotra, an island archipelago that is part of Yemen. It grows in mountain shrubland dominated by Cephalocroton, where it can be found with the endemic tree Dracaena cinnabari. It is rarer than other local shrubby Hypericum species. It can be distinguished from them by its pubescent herbage.
