= Hypericum haplophylloides =

Scientific classification
- Kingdom: Plantae
- Clade: Tracheophytes
- Clade: Angiosperms
- Clade: Eudicots
- Clade: Rosids
- Order: Malpighiales
- Family: Hypericaceae
- Genus: Hypericum
- Section: Hypericum sect. Triadenoides
- Species: H. haplophylloides

Binomial name
- Hypericum haplophylloides Halácsy & Bald.

Subspecies
- Hypericum haplophylloides subsp. devollense F.K.Mey.; Hypericum haplophylloides subsp. haplophylloides

Species of flowering plant in the St John's wort family

Hypericum haplophylloides is a species of flowering plant in the family Hypericaceae which is endemic to Albania.
