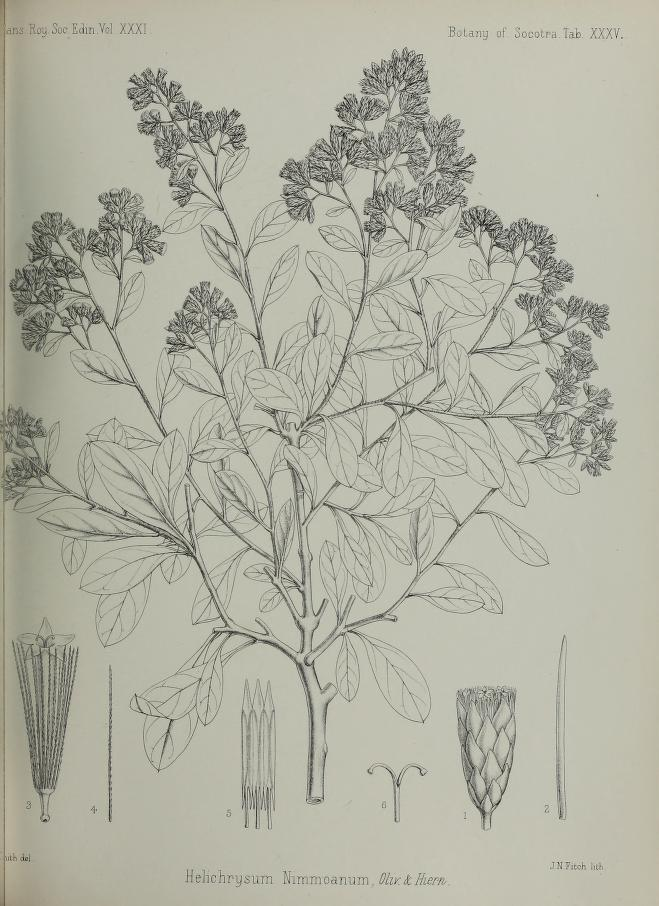

Conservation status
- Vulnerable (IUCN 3.1)

Scientific classification
- Kingdom: Plantae
- Clade: Tracheophytes
- Clade: Angiosperms
- Clade: Eudicots
- Clade: Asterids
- Order: Asterales
- Family: Asteraceae
- Genus: Libinhania
- Species: L. nimmoana

Binomial name
- Libinhania nimmoana (Oliv. & Hiern) N.Kilian, Galbany, Oberpr. & A.G.Mill.

Synonyms
- Helichrysum nimmoanum Oliv. & Hiern

= Libinhania nimmoana =

Species of flowering plant

Libinhania nimmoana, synonym Helichrysum nimmoanum, is a species of flowering plant in the family Asteraceae. It is endemic to the island of Socotra in Yemen. Its natural habitat is subtropical or tropical dry forests.
