= Hypericum musadoganii =

Scientific classification
- Kingdom: Plantae
- Clade: Tracheophytes
- Clade: Angiosperms
- Clade: Eudicots
- Clade: Rosids
- Order: Malpighiales
- Family: Hypericaceae
- Genus: Hypericum
- Section: Hypericum sect. Triadenoides
- Species: H. musadoganii

Binomial name
- Hypericum musadoganii Yıld.

Species of flowering plant in the St John's wort family

Hypericum musadoganii is a species of flowering plant in the family Hypericaceae.
