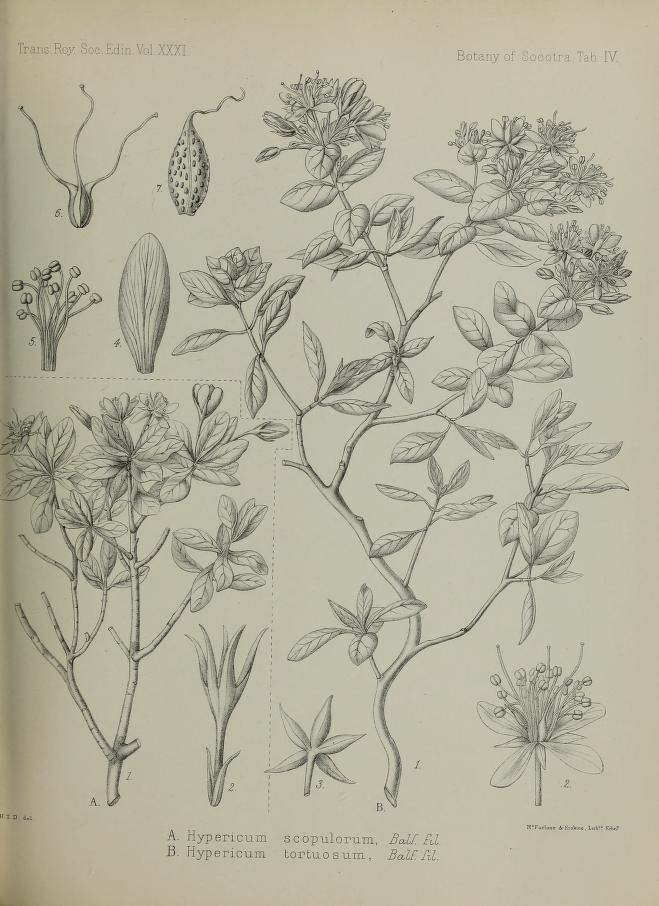
- H. tortuosum (B, right) alongside H. scopulorum (A, left)

Scientific classification
- Kingdom: Plantae
- Clade: Tracheophytes
- Clade: Angiosperms
- Clade: Eudicots
- Clade: Rosids
- Order: Malpighiales
- Family: Hypericaceae
- Genus: Hypericum
- Section: Hypericum sect. Triadenoides; Jaub. & Spach

Species
- Hypericum fieriense N. Robson; Hypericum haplophylloides Halácsy & Bald.; Hypericum musadoganii Yıld.; Hypericum pallens Banks & Solander; Hypericum scopulorum Balf.f.; Hypericum ternatum Poulter; Hypericum tortuosum Balf.f.

= Hypericum sect. Triadenoides =

Group of flowering plants

Triadenoides is one of 36 sections in the genus Hypericum which contains seven species. Its species are found in Socotra, Turkey, Syria, and Lebanon.
