= Libinhania fontinalis =

Conservation status
- Endangered (IUCN 3.1)

Scientific classification
- Kingdom: Plantae
- Clade: Tracheophytes
- Clade: Angiosperms
- Clade: Eudicots
- Clade: Asterids
- Order: Asterales
- Family: Asteraceae
- Genus: Libinhania
- Species: L. fontinalis

Binomial name
- Libinhania fontinalis A.G.Mill., Sommerer & N.Kilian

Species of flowering plant

Libinhania fontinalis is a species of flowering plant in the family Asteraceae. It is found only in Socotra, an African island which is politically part of Yemen. Its natural habitat is rocky areas. It is threatened by habitat loss.

Provisionally referred to as "Helichrysum sp. nov. C", it was described in 2017.
