= Libinhania =

Scientific classification
- Kingdom: Plantae
- Clade: Tracheophytes
- Clade: Angiosperms
- Clade: Eudicots
- Clade: Asterids
- Order: Asterales
- Family: Asteraceae
- Subfamily: Asteroideae
- Tribe: Gnaphalieae
- Genus: Libinhania; N.Kilian, Galbany, Oberpr. & A.G.Mill.

Species
- See text.

Genus of plants

Libinhania is a genus of flowering plant in the family Asteraceae, native to Somalia and Socotra. The genus was established in 2017, as a result of a molecular phylogenetic study, which showed that a number of species endemic to Socotra, some of which had been placed in the genus Helichrysum, formed a clade that did not belong in that genus.

== Species ==
As of March 2023, Plants of the World Online accepted the following species:

- Libinhania acicularis (Balf.f.) N.Kilian, Galbany, Oberpr. & A.G.Mill.
- Libinhania arachnoides (Balf.f.) N.Kilian, Galbany, Oberpr. & A.G.Mill.
- Libinhania balfourii (Vierh.) N.Kilian, Galbany, Oberpr. & A.G.Mill.
- Libinhania discolor A.G.Mill., Sommerer & N.Kilian
- Libinhania fontinalis A.G.Mill., Sommerer & N.Kilian
- Libinhania gracilipes (Oliv. & Hiern) N.Kilian, Galbany, Oberpr. & A.G.Mill.
- Libinhania hegerensis A.G.Mill. & N.Kilian
- Libinhania nimmoana (Oliv. & Hiern) N.Kilian, Galbany, Oberpr. & A.G.Mill.
- Libinhania nivea A.G.Mill., Sommerer & N.Kilian
- Libinhania pendula A.G.Mill., Sommerer & N.Kilian
- Libinhania rosulata (Oliv. & Hiern) N.Kilian, Galbany, Oberpr. & A.G.Mill.
- Libinhania sphaerocephala (Balf.f.) N.Kilian, Galbany, Oberpr. & A.G.Mill.
- Libinhania suffruticosa (Balf.f.) N.Kilian, Galbany, Oberpr. & A.G.Mill.
