= Libinhania arachnoides =

Conservation status
- Least Concern (IUCN 3.1)

Scientific classification
- Kingdom: Plantae
- Clade: Tracheophytes
- Clade: Angiosperms
- Clade: Eudicots
- Clade: Asterids
- Order: Asterales
- Family: Asteraceae
- Genus: Libinhania
- Species: L. arachnoides

Binomial name
- Libinhania arachnoides (Balf.f.) N.Kilian, Galbany, Oberpr. & A.G.Mill.

Synonyms
- Helichrysum arachnoides Balf.f.

Species of flowering plant

Libinhania arachnoides, synonym Helichrysum arachnoides, is a species of flowering plant in the family Asteraceae. It is endemic to the islands of Socotra and Samhah in Yemen. Its natural habitat is subtropical or tropical dry forests.
