= Libinhania nivea =

Conservation status
- Vulnerable (IUCN 3.1)

Scientific classification
- Kingdom: Plantae
- Clade: Tracheophytes
- Clade: Angiosperms
- Clade: Eudicots
- Clade: Asterids
- Order: Asterales
- Family: Asteraceae
- Genus: Libinhania
- Species: L. nivea

Binomial name
- Libinhania nivea A.G.Mill., Sommerer & N.Kilian

Species of flowering plant

Libinhainia nivea is a species of flowering plant in the family Asteraceae. It is found only on Socotra, an African island which is part of Yemen. Its natural habitat is rocky areas.

Provisionally referred to as "Helichrysum sp. nov. A", it was described in 2017.
