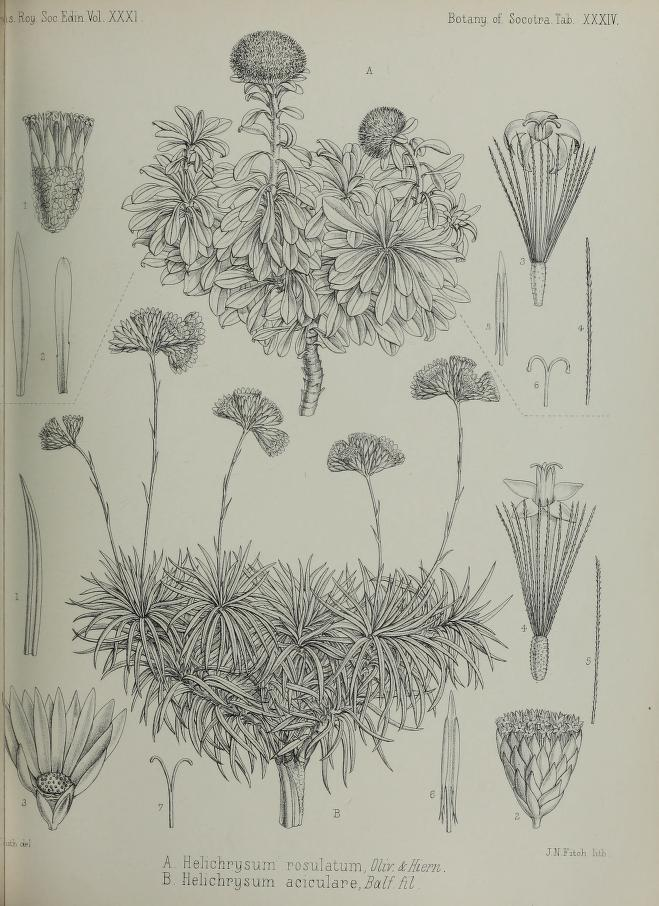

Conservation status
- Least Concern (IUCN 3.1)

Scientific classification
- Kingdom: Plantae
- Clade: Tracheophytes
- Clade: Angiosperms
- Clade: Eudicots
- Clade: Asterids
- Order: Asterales
- Family: Asteraceae
- Genus: Libinhania
- Species: L. rosulata

Binomial name
- Libinhania rosulata (Oliv. & Hiern) N.Kilian, Galbany, Oberpr. & A.G.Mill.

Synonyms
- Helichrysum rosulatum Oliv. & Hiern

= Libinhania rosulata =

Species of flowering plant

Libinhania rosulata, synonym Helichrysum rosulatum, is a species of flowering plant in the family Asteraceae. It is endemic to Socotra. Its natural habitat is rocky areas.
