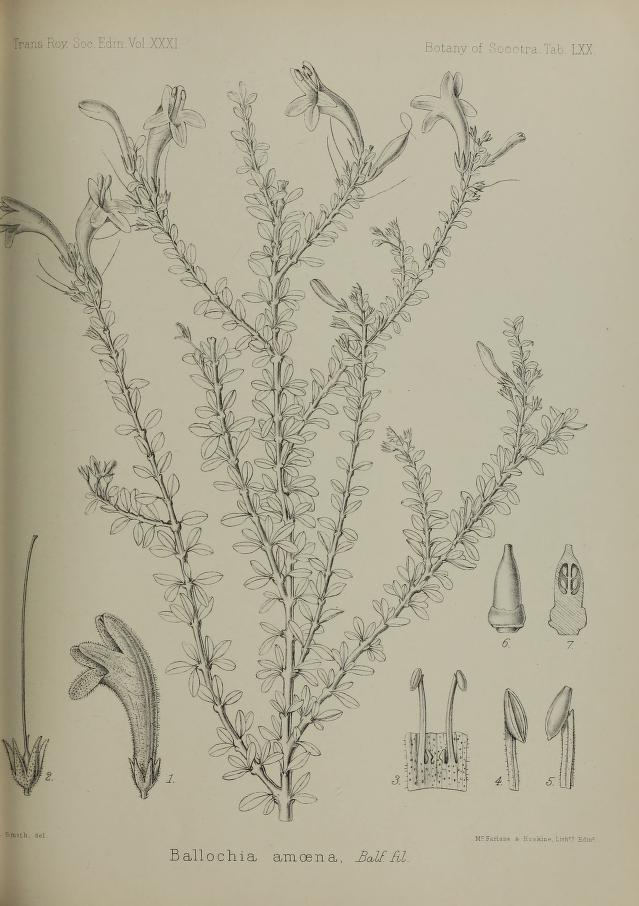
- Illustration of Ballochia amoena

Scientific classification
- Kingdom: Plantae
- Clade: Tracheophytes
- Clade: Angiosperms
- Clade: Eudicots
- Clade: Asterids
- Order: Lamiales
- Family: Acanthaceae
- Subfamily: Acanthoideae
- Tribe: Justicieae
- Genus: Ballochia; Balf.f. (1883)

Species
- Ballochia amoena Balf.f.; Ballochia atrovirgata Balf.f.; Ballochia rotundifolia Balf.f.

= Ballochia =

Genus of flowering plants

Ballochia is a genus of flowering plant in the family Acanthaceae. It is endemic to Socotra. It contains the following species:

- Ballochia amoena Balf.f.
- Ballochia atrovirgata Balf.f.
- Ballochia rotundifolia Balf.f.
