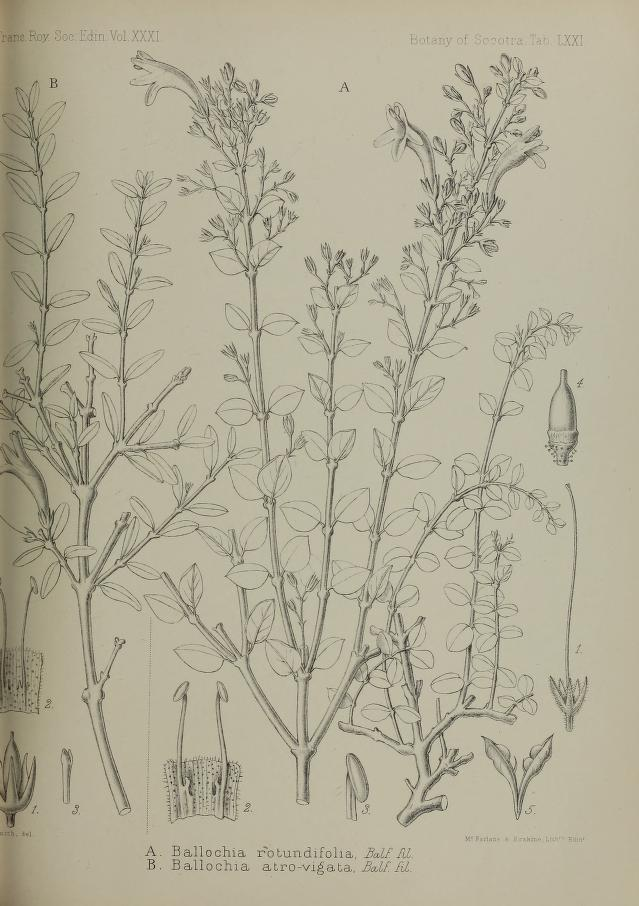
- Figure A

Conservation status
- Data Deficient (IUCN 3.1)

Scientific classification
- Kingdom: Plantae
- Clade: Tracheophytes
- Clade: Angiosperms
- Clade: Eudicots
- Clade: Asterids
- Order: Lamiales
- Family: Acanthaceae
- Genus: Ballochia
- Species: B. rotundifolia

Binomial name
- Ballochia rotundifolia Balf.f.

= Ballochia rotundifolia =

Species of flowering plant

Ballochia rotundifolia is a species of plant in the family Acanthaceae. It is endemic to Socotra. Its natural habitat is subtropical or tropical dry forests.
