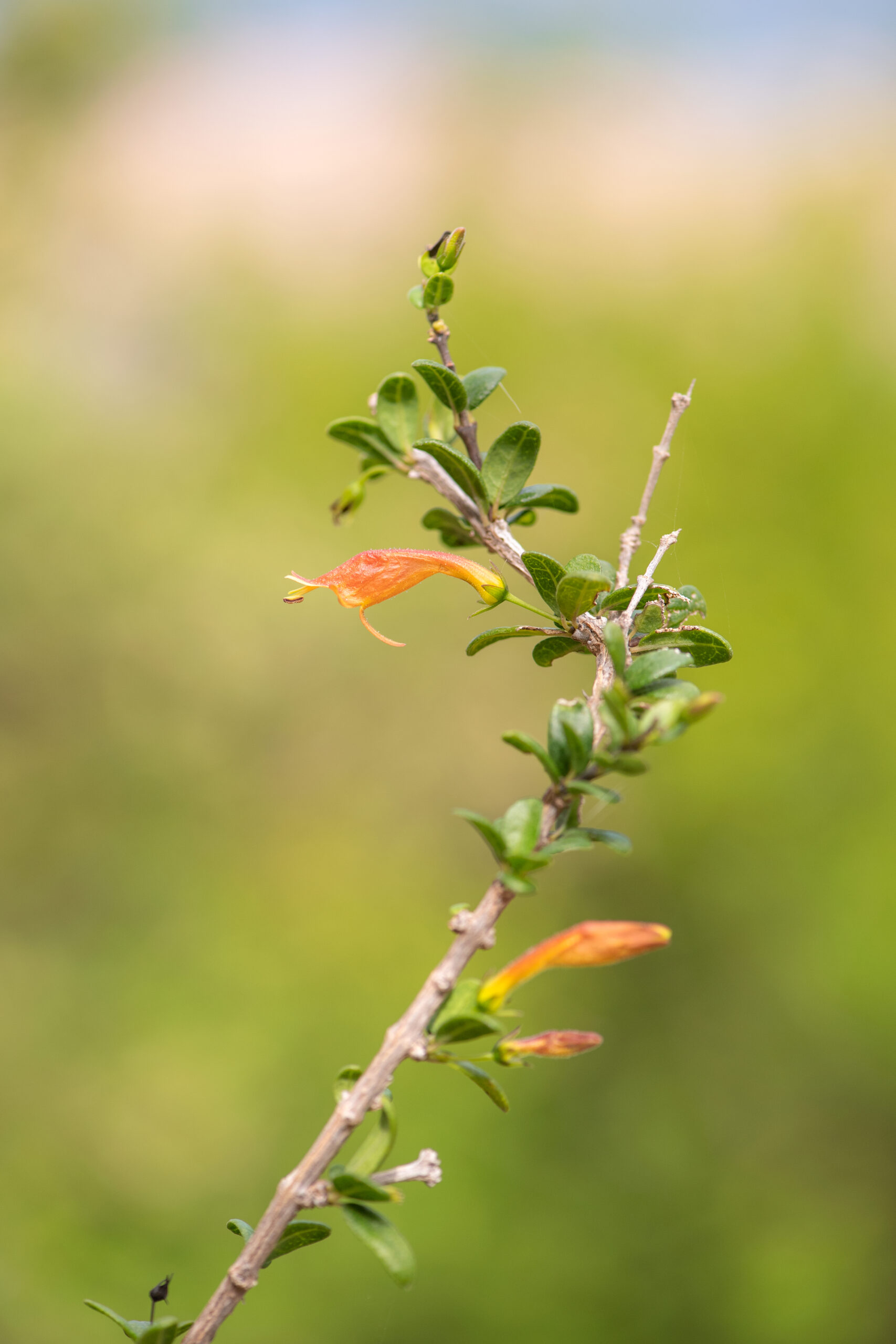
- A lone Ballochia amoena sprig

Conservation status
- Data Deficient (IUCN 3.1)

Scientific classification
- Kingdom: Plantae
- Clade: Tracheophytes
- Clade: Angiosperms
- Clade: Eudicots
- Clade: Asterids
- Order: Lamiales
- Family: Acanthaceae
- Genus: Ballochia
- Species: B. amoena

Binomial name
- Ballochia amoena Balf.f.

= Ballochia amoena =

Species of flowering plant

Ballochia amoena is a species of flowering plant in the family Acanthaceae. It is endemic to the island of Socotra. Its natural habitats are subtropical, tropical dry forests and subtropical or tropical dry shrubland.

Ballochia amoena is a densely branched shrub that can grow to as much as 2 meters (6.5 ft) in height. It is an important source of food for domesticated sheep and goats during the summer months as they retain their leaves. They are not generally eaten by the island's domestic cattle due to the spiny nature of the bushes.
