= Ballochia atrovirgata =

Conservation status
- Data Deficient (IUCN 3.1)

Scientific classification
- Kingdom: Plantae
- Clade: Tracheophytes
- Clade: Angiosperms
- Clade: Eudicots
- Clade: Asterids
- Order: Lamiales
- Family: Acanthaceae
- Genus: Ballochia
- Species: B. atrovirgata

Binomial name
- Ballochia atrovirgata Balf.f. (1883)

Synonyms
- Ballochia puberula Vierh. (1906)

Species of flowering plant

Ballochia atrovirgata is a species of plant in the family Acanthaceae. It is endemic to the island of Socotra in Yemen. Its natural habitats are subtropical or tropical dry forests, subtropical or tropical dry shrubland, and subtropical or tropical dry lowland grassland.
