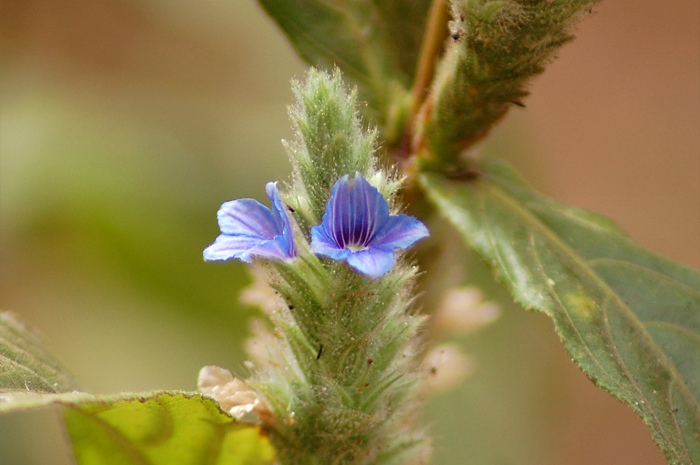
- Neuracanthus tetragonostachyus subsp. trinervius

Scientific classification
- Kingdom: Plantae
- Clade: Tracheophytes
- Clade: Angiosperms
- Clade: Eudicots
- Clade: Asterids
- Order: Lamiales
- Family: Acanthaceae
- Tribe: Acantheae
- Genus: Neuracanthus; Nees (1832)

Synonyms
- Leucobarleria Lindau (1895)

= Neuracanthus =

Genus of flowering plants

Neuracanthus is a genus of flowering plants in the family Acanthaceae. It includes 32 species native to tropical Africa, Madagascar, the Arabian Peninsula, Indian subcontinent, and Indochina.

== Species ==
As of February 2024, Plants of the World Online accepted the following species:

- Neuracanthus aculeatus Balf.f.
- Neuracanthus africanus T.Anderson ex S.Moore
- Neuracanthus argyrophyllus Chiov.
- Neuracanthus brachystachyus Benoist
- Neuracanthus capitatus Balf.f.
- Neuracanthus cladanthacanthus Chiov.
- Neuracanthus decorus S.Moore
- Neuracanthus gracilior S.Moore
- Neuracanthus grandiflorus Kurz
- Neuracanthus keniensis J.-P.Lebrun & Stork
- Neuracanthus leandrii Benoist
- Neuracanthus lindaui C.B.Clarke
- Neuracanthus madagascariensis Benoist
- Neuracanthus mahajangensis Bidgood & Brummitt
- Neuracanthus matsabdianus Bidgood & Brummitt
- Neuracanthus migiurtinus Bidgood & Brummitt
- Neuracanthus neesianus C.B.Clarke
- Neuracanthus niveus S.Moore
- Neuracanthus ovalifolius (Fiori) Bidgood & Brummitt
- Neuracanthus pedalis Bidgood & Brummitt
- Neuracanthus pictus M.G.Gilbert
- Neuracanthus polyacanthus (Lindau) C.B.Clarke
- Neuracanthus richardianus (Nees) Boivin ex Benoist
- Neuracanthus robecchii (Lindau) C.B.Clarke
- Neuracanthus scaber S.Moore
- Neuracanthus sphaerostachyus (Nees) Dalzell
- Neuracanthus spinosus Deflers
- Neuracanthus subuninervis Kurz
- Neuracanthus tephrophyllus Bidgood & Brummitt
- Neuracanthus tetragonostachyus Nees
- Neuracanthus ukambensis C.B.Clarke
- Neuracanthus umbraticus Bidgood & Brummitt
