= Neuracanthus aculeatus =

Conservation status
- Endangered (IUCN 3.1)

Scientific classification
- Kingdom: Plantae
- Clade: Tracheophytes
- Clade: Angiosperms
- Clade: Eudicots
- Clade: Asterids
- Order: Lamiales
- Family: Acanthaceae
- Genus: Neuracanthus
- Species: N. aculeatus

Binomial name
- Neuracanthus aculeatus Balf.f.

Species of plant

Neuracanthus aculeatus is a species of plant in the family Acanthaceae. It is endemic to Yemen. Its natural habitats are subtropical or tropical dry shrubland and subtropical or tropical dry lowland grassland. It is threatened by habitat loss.
