= Trichocalyx =

Scientific classification
- Kingdom: Plantae
- Clade: Tracheophytes
- Clade: Angiosperms
- Clade: Eudicots
- Clade: Asterids
- Order: Lamiales
- Family: Acanthaceae
- Subfamily: Acanthoideae
- Tribe: Justicieae
- Genus: Trichocalyx; Balf.f. (1883)

Genus of flowering plants

Trichocalyx is a genus of plant in family Acanthaceae. It contains two species endemic to the island of Socotra.

- Trichocalyx obovatus Balf.f.
- Trichocalyx orbiculatus Balf.f.
