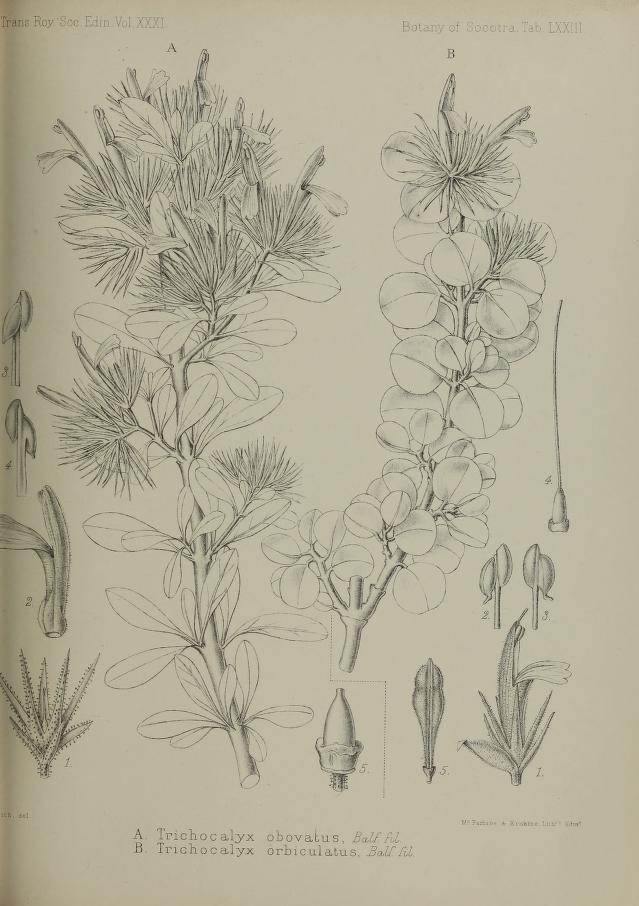
- Trichocalyx orbiculatus

Conservation status
- Data Deficient (IUCN 3.1)

Scientific classification
- Kingdom: Plantae
- Clade: Tracheophytes
- Clade: Angiosperms
- Clade: Eudicots
- Clade: Asterids
- Order: Lamiales
- Family: Acanthaceae
- Genus: Trichocalyx
- Species: T. orbiculatus

Binomial name
- Trichocalyx orbiculatus Balf.f.

= Trichocalyx orbiculatus =

Species of plant

Trichocalyx orbiculatus is a species of plant in the family Acanthaceae. It is endemic to Socotra. Its natural habitats are subtropical or tropical dry forests and subtropical or tropical dry shrubland.
