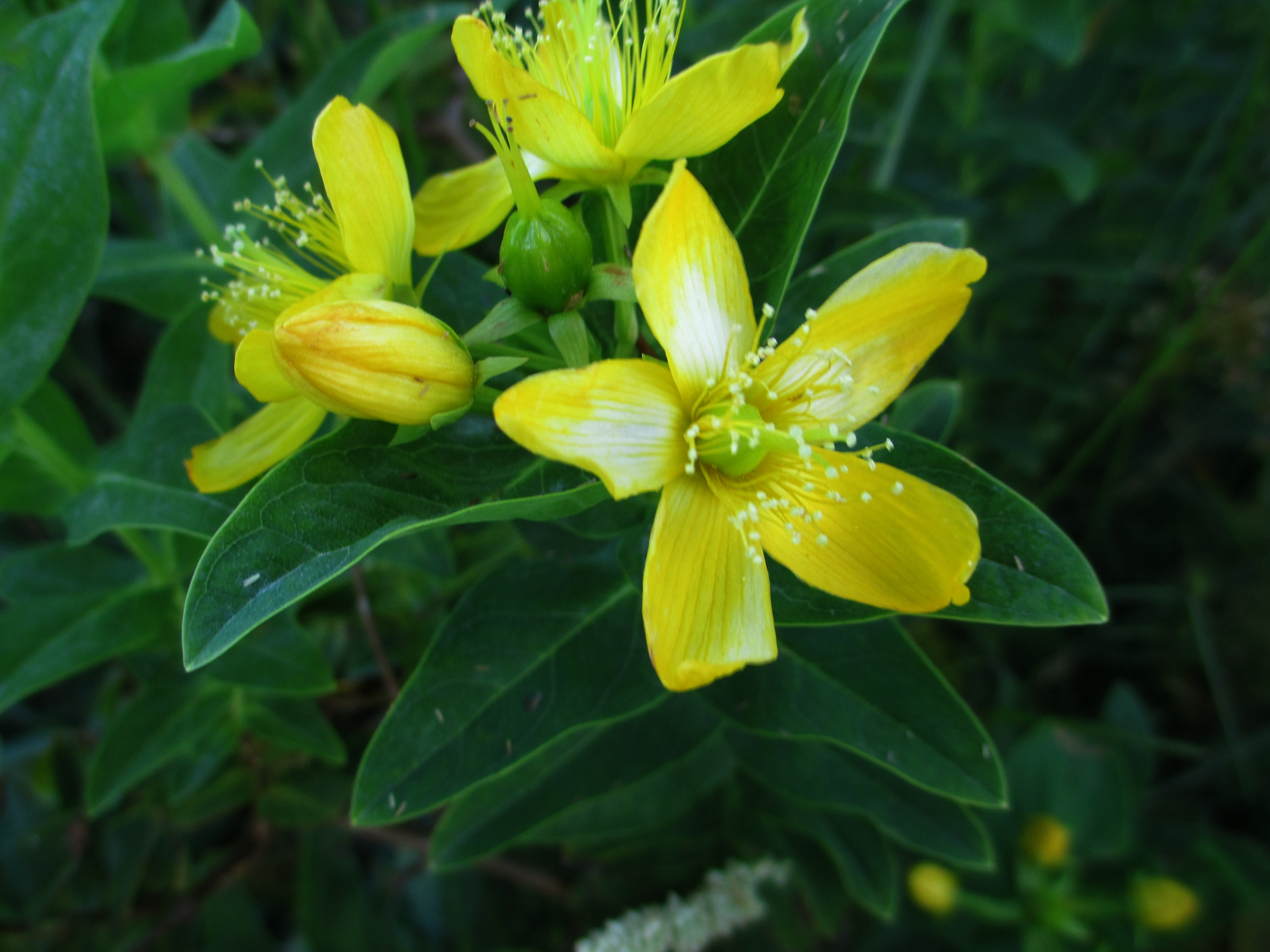

Conservation status
- Least Concern (IUCN 3.1)

Scientific classification
- Kingdom: Plantae
- Clade: Tracheophytes
- Clade: Angiosperms
- Clade: Eudicots
- Clade: Rosids
- Order: Malpighiales
- Family: Hypericaceae
- Genus: Hypericum
- Section: Hypericum sect. Androsaemum
- Species: H. foliosum

Binomial name
- Hypericum foliosum Aiton

= Hypericum foliosum =

Species of flowering plant in the St John's wort family

Hypericum foliosum, the shining St John's wort, is a species of flowering plant in the family Hypericaceae. It is a bushy shrub endemic to the Portuguese Azores Islands with golden yellow petals and many stems. The species was described by William Aiton in 1789 and was later placed into section Androsaemum of the genus Hypericum by Norman Robson in 1984. It has a diverse essential oil profile made up mostly of monoterpene hydrocarbons, and significant concentrations of various medicinally useful phenols and carotenoids. Populations of the plant are small in number, but quick to colonize cleared areas like groves, landslide areas, and volcanic ash deposits. It is parasitized by fungus and by moth species, but is not considered endangered by the IUCN. H. foliosum is used in traditional medicine on the Azores for diuretic, hepatoprotective, and antihypertensive purposes. It also has in vitro antibiotic and antioxidizing capabilities.

== Etymology ==
The genus name Hypericum is possibly derived from the Greek words hyper (above) and eikon (picture), in reference to the tradition of hanging the plant over religious icons in the home. The specific epithet "foliosum" comes from the Latin word "foliosus" which refers to a leaf. In the Azores Islands, Hypericum foliosum is known as malfurada or furalha. In English, it is called the shining St John's wort.

== Description ==
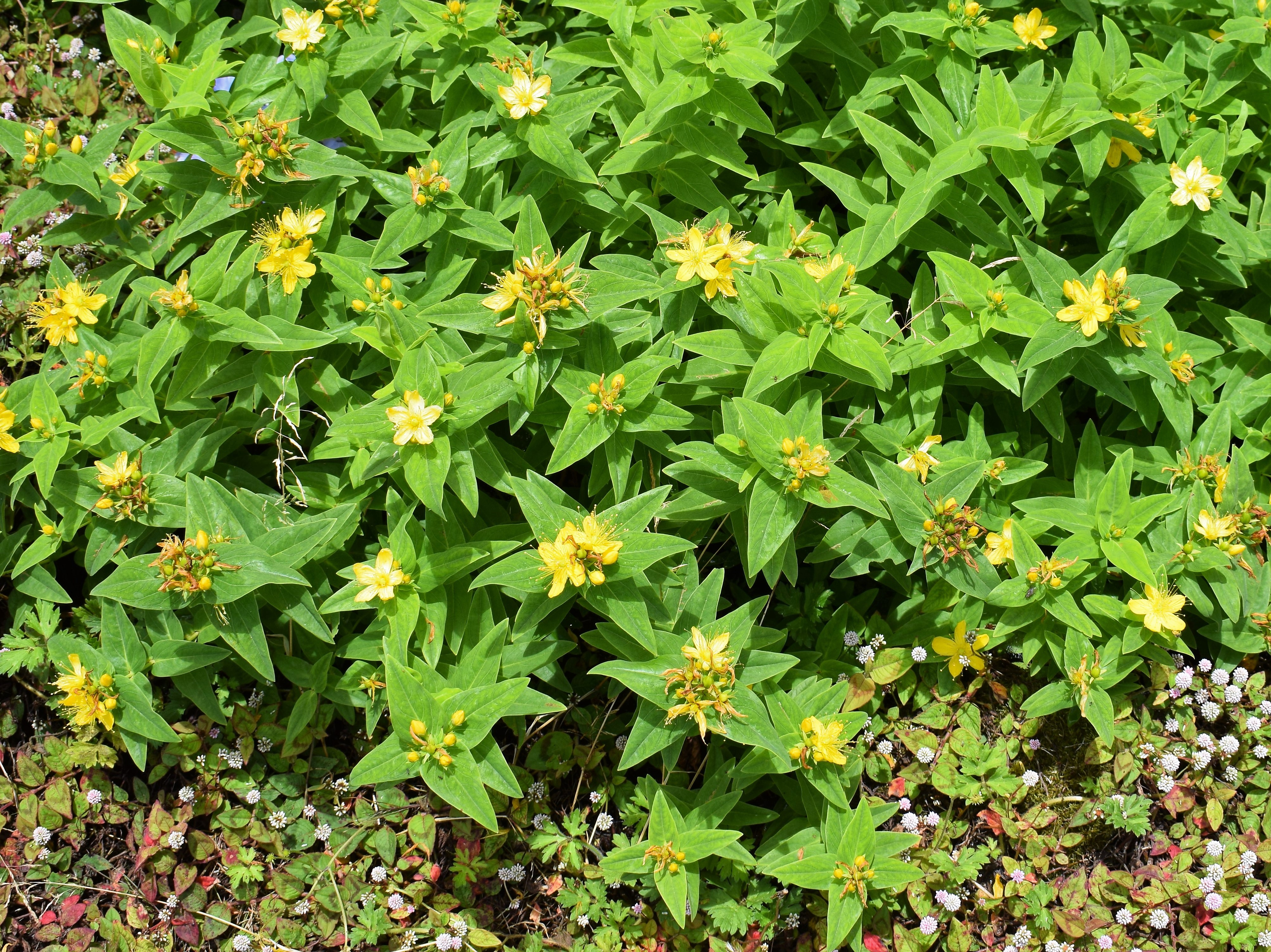
Hypericum foliosum is a bushy shrub with many stems.

Hypericum foliosum is a perennial shrub that grows at least 50–100 centimeters (20–39 in) tall. It may be bushy, and its branches grow both upright and outwards from the center of the plant. It usually flowers in August.

=== Vegetative structures ===
The stems are notched, showing crenation, and are a yellow-brown color. The stems are flattened when the plant is young, but become more round as it matures. They are covered in bark covered in lengthwise ridges and dark pits that stand out against the lighter surface. The stem has an average width of around 0.35 cm, and there is around 2 cm of stem between leaves. When viewed in cross-section, there are four distinct rings in the stem. The outermost is a thick, reddish-brown cuticle of cork. The next two rings are an external and internal cortex containing secretory canals, vascular bundles, rows of phloem, and secondary xylem. The innermost ring is made of pith with starch grains in the cells.

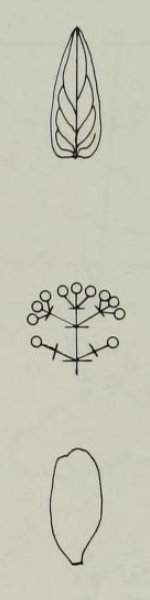
From top to bottom: leaf, flower cluster, and petal of H. foliosum

The leaves are located on opposite sides of the stem and are shaped like an egg that is stretched to be longer, or similar to a lance. They are 3.5–6.0 cm (1.4–2.4 in) long and 1–3.2 cm (0.4–1.3 in) wide. Their texture is papery and they are a lighter color on the undersides. The edges of the leaf are smooth and lack notches, and the point tapers in a sharp angle. There is either no leafstalk or a very short leafstalk that attaches each leaf to the stem. There are also small stipules near the leafstalk that are yellow-brown like the stems. There are no stomata on the upper surface of the leaf, but there are several kinds of the guard cells on the undersides. There are also many translucent oil glands scattered across both leaf surfaces. The central leaf vein is flanked by 4–5 pairs of ascending veins, and the leaf's network of small tertiary veins are also clearly visible. The leaves contain both chlorophyll a and chlorophyll b.

=== Flowering structures ===
The flowers of Hypericum foliosum are grouped in clusters of 1–9, in a shape between a corymb and umbel. The branches that carry the flowers generally grow upwards, and the cluster sometimes has accessory flowers lower on the branches. The stalks that bear an individual flower are 0.7–1.2 cm long with small lance-shaped bracts. Each flower is 2.5–3.0 cm wide; when buds, they are shaped between an ellipsoid and an imperfect sphere and are not pointed at the end. The sepals are usually 0.3–0.6 cm long and 0.1–0.3 cm wide. They overlap one another, are of differing sizes even on one flower, and remain after the flower fruits. The shape of the sepals varies: they could look like a triangular lance or a flattened ellipse, and their ends can be blunt or pointed. The glands on the surface of the sepals are arranged in lines, and there are also dense glands along the edges.

The petals are golden yellow and lack a red tinge. They are 1.2–1.8 cm long and 0.5–0.8 cm wide, with the shape of an inverted lance. The stamens are bundled in fascicles of 20–30, the longest of which measure 1.2–1.8 cm long. The ovary is oval-shaped with styles that are 0.5–1.0 cm long and stigmas that end in a distinct narrow head. The seed capsule is 0.8–1.3 cm long and 0.7–1.0 cm wide, with a wide cylindrical shape and an end that is blunt or pointed. They start out somewhat fleshy but quickly dry out and eventually split open, though sometimes only partially. The seeds are yellow-brown and have wing shaped appendages.

=== Similar species ===
Hypericum foliosum is most similar in appearance to the other species in section Androsaemum. Most of its characteristics are between those of H. grandifolium and H. androsaemum, except for its leaves which are narrower than either. It can be told apart from H. grandifolium by its denser flower clusters, smaller flowers, and shorter styles. It is also highly similar to the hybrid Hypericum × inodorum, but is differentiated by the shape of its sepals and seed capsules.

=== Chemistry ===
Like many other Hypericum species, Hypericum foliosum has a diverse essential oil profile, with volume per weight yields of around 0.10–0.25%. Nonane and limonene were universally dominant in the plant's extracts. Other compounds like terpinolene, caryophyllene, and pinene sometimes can make up a significant percentage of the oil. In general, monoterpene hydrocarbons are more common than sesquiterpenes.

Phenols are a group of chemical compounds produced by plants that are common in medical products. In extract taken from the leaves of the plant, the main phenolic compounds are caffeoylquinic acids and quercetin. The stems and roots lack quercetin, and the seed capsules contain neither. Another chemical component of the plant are the carotenoids, which help create bright colors and aid in reproduction. These compounds are found most densely in the leaves, stem, and bark; the roots, seeds, and flowers have much lower concentrations.

== Taxonomy ==
- "Androsaemum‑group"
  - sect. Arthrophyllum
  - sect. Triadenioides
  - - sect. Webbia
      H. canariense
    - - sect. Bupleuroides
        H. bupleuroides
      - sect. Androsaemum
        - H. androsaemum
        - - - H. hircinum
            - H. foliosum
          - H. grandifolium

Cladogram showing the phylogeny and relationships of H. foliosum within the "Androsaemum-group" based on Meseguer et al. 2013

The species was first formally described as Hypericum foliosum in 1789 in the botanical journal Hortus Kewensis by William Aiton. In this original description, based on the type specimen collected on São Miguel in 1777, Aiton noted the species' long petals and sharp calyx as differentiating characteristics. Augustin Pyramus de Candolle followed Aiton's nomenclature in 1824, as did several other authors through the 19th century.

Norman Robson included the species in an assay of Hypericum as a contribution to the 1968 work Flora Europaea. He further analyzed Hypericum foliosum in 1984 as a part of his monograph of the genus. A 2013 study used Bayesian inference to establish the phylogeny and close relations of Hypericum species. Section Androsaemum, including Hypericum foliosum, was placed into an Old World taxon called the "Androsaemum-group" with several other sections. The study also determined that H. foliosum was most closely related to Hypericum hircinum.

== Ecology ==
Hypericum foliosum is endemic to the Azores Islands in the North Atlantic, where it can be found on every island. It inhabits the laurel and juniper forests of the archipelago, especially in shady and damp areas of mountainous regions at elevations of 220–800 meters (720–2,620 ft). It also grows in stands of Pittosporum trees and is quick to inhabit volcanic ash deposits. In general, it is good at colonizing recently cleared areas like man-made clearings and landslide sites. Populations at a site are usually made up of only a few plants.

Several parasites are hosted by the leaves of H. foliosum. The rust fungus Melampsora hypericorum takes the form of a pustule on the leaf, damaging the surface. Larvae of the moth Caloptilia aurantiaca mine into the leaves and later live under the folded tip of the blade.

H. foliosum is not directly endangered by competition with invasive species or human actions; it was listed as Least Concern by the IUCN in 2016. However, it has been studied as a model for using micropropagation as a conservation method on the Azores. Micropropagation has previously been used in Hypericum perforatum and Hypericum canariense. A single node of the species that is propagated using this method can yield 2–4 new plants in around four months.

== Uses ==
While no official pharmacological usage of Hypericum foliosum were recorded as of 2011, locals in the Azores describe the species as being used in traditional medicine in similar ways to other species in the genus. Some of these applications derive from the diuretic, hepatoprotective, and antihypertensive properties of its extract. Despite having more phenolic activity than H. undulatum and H. androsaemum, those two species are as or more common in Portuguese medicinal markets. H. foliosum has exhibited in vitro antibiotic effects on infectious bacteria like Staphylococcus aureus. Its carotenoid and phenolic oils give the plant's extract antioxidant properties. The lower parts of the plant like the stem, bark, and roots are the most effective.
