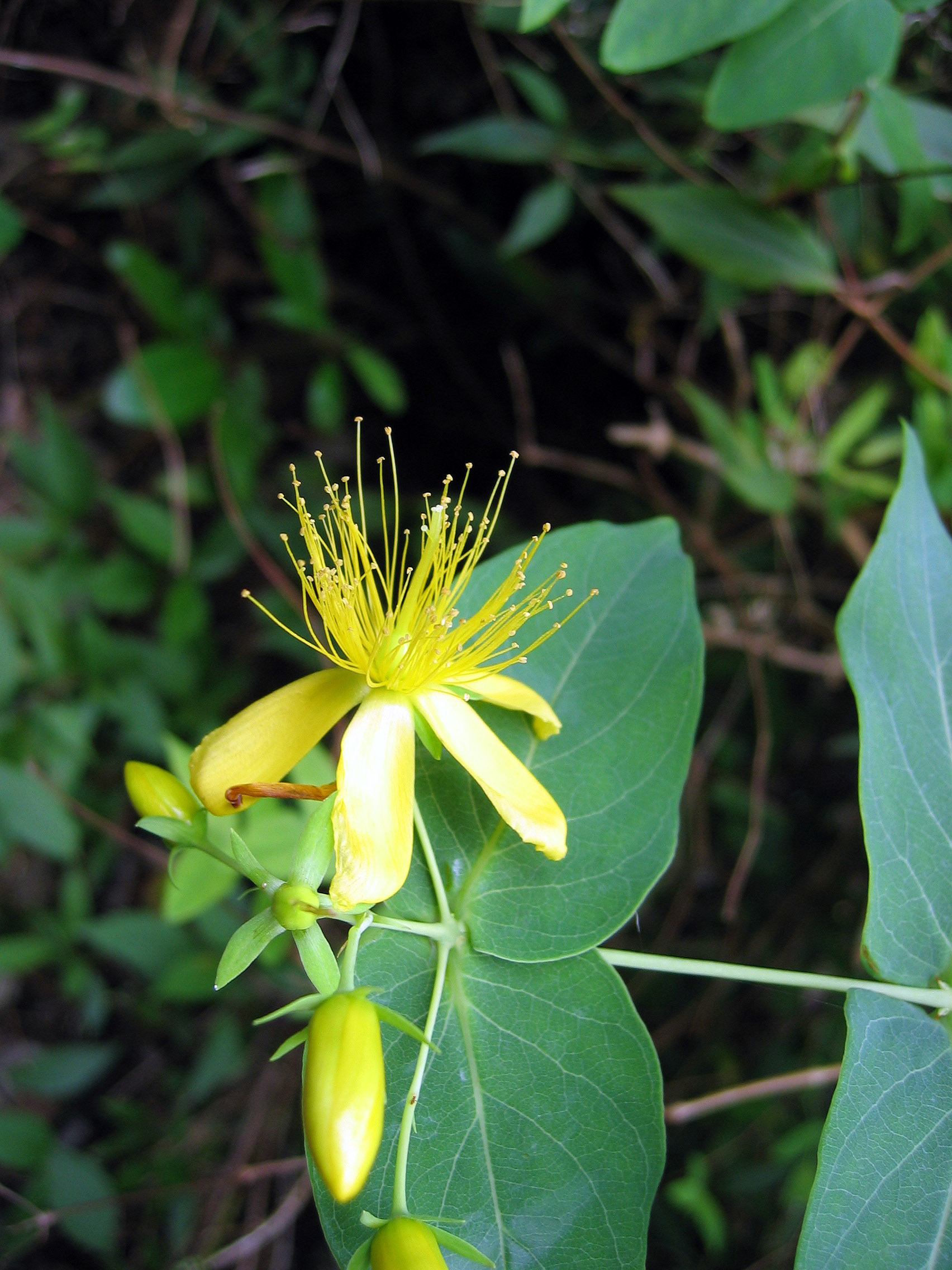

Scientific classification
- Kingdom: Plantae
- Clade: Tracheophytes
- Clade: Angiosperms
- Clade: Eudicots
- Clade: Rosids
- Order: Malpighiales
- Family: Hypericaceae
- Genus: Hypericum
- Section: Hypericum sect. Androsaemum
- Species: H. grandifolium

Binomial name
- Hypericum grandifolium Choisy

= Hypericum grandifolium =

Species of flowering plant in the St John's wort family

Hypericum grandifolium, the large-leaved St John's wort, is a species of flowering plant in the family Hypericaceae. The plant is a bushy shrub that can grow to almost 2 meters tall. It has large leaves, golden yellow petals, and seed capsules that split open. H. grandifolium is native to the Canary Islands and Madeira in Macaronesia, but has become invasive in other regions, including California, after escaping from cultivation as an ornamental plant. It is parasitized by wasps and fungi, and is capable of reproducing through its rhizomes.

First described in 1821 by Jacques Choisy, the ambiguity of its original description meant that the species was often misidentified. Specimens were variously called H. elatum, H. anglicum, Androsaemum webbianum, and others. The species was placed into section Androsaemum of Hypericum by Norman Robson in 1984, and it is most closely related in appearance and classification to the other species in the section, especially H. androsaemum, H. hircinum, and H. × inodorum. The species is not used in modern medical applications, but may have anticancer potential and could be used to treat ear edemas.

== Etymology ==
The genus name Hypericum is possibly derived from the Greek words hyper (above) and eikon (picture), in reference to the tradition of hanging the plant over religious icons in the home. The specific epithet grandifolium is made of the Latin words grandis (large, full) and folium (leaf). As such, it is called the large-leaved St John's wort in English. Hypericum grandifolium is known as malfurada, (Note: Also spelled malforada, milfurada, malforado, or maljurada) malfurada grande, and corazoncillo in Spanish, the language used where it is native. The name corazoncillo is a diminutive form of the Spanish word for heart, corazon.

== Description ==
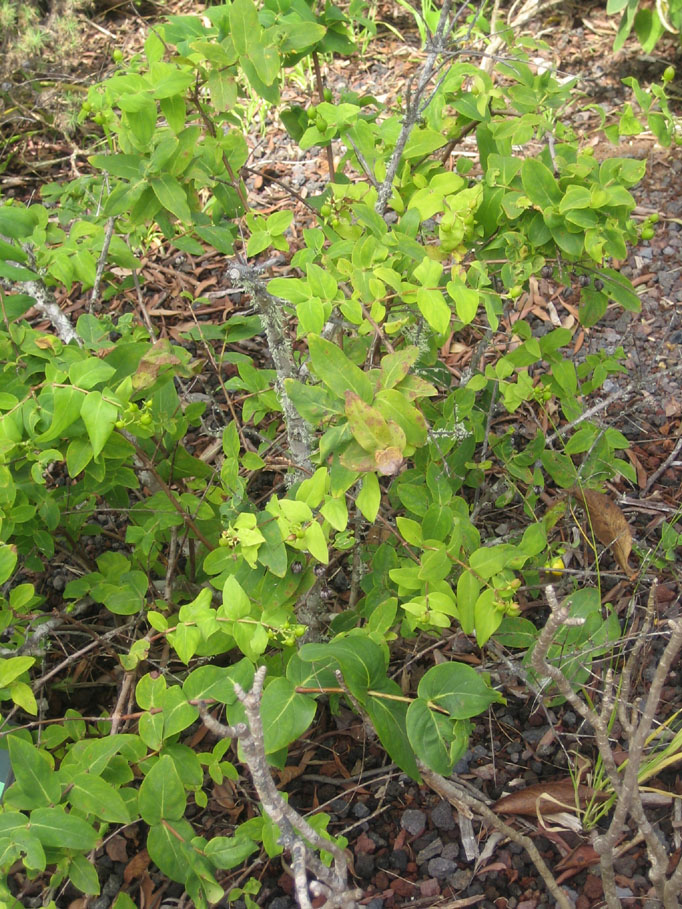
Bushy form of the plant

Hypericum grandifolium is a bushy shrub that grows 50–180 centimeters tall. Its branches generally grow upright or almost upright. Across its distribution, different populations look almost identical and the species has minimal geographic variation in appearance.

=== Vegetative structures ===
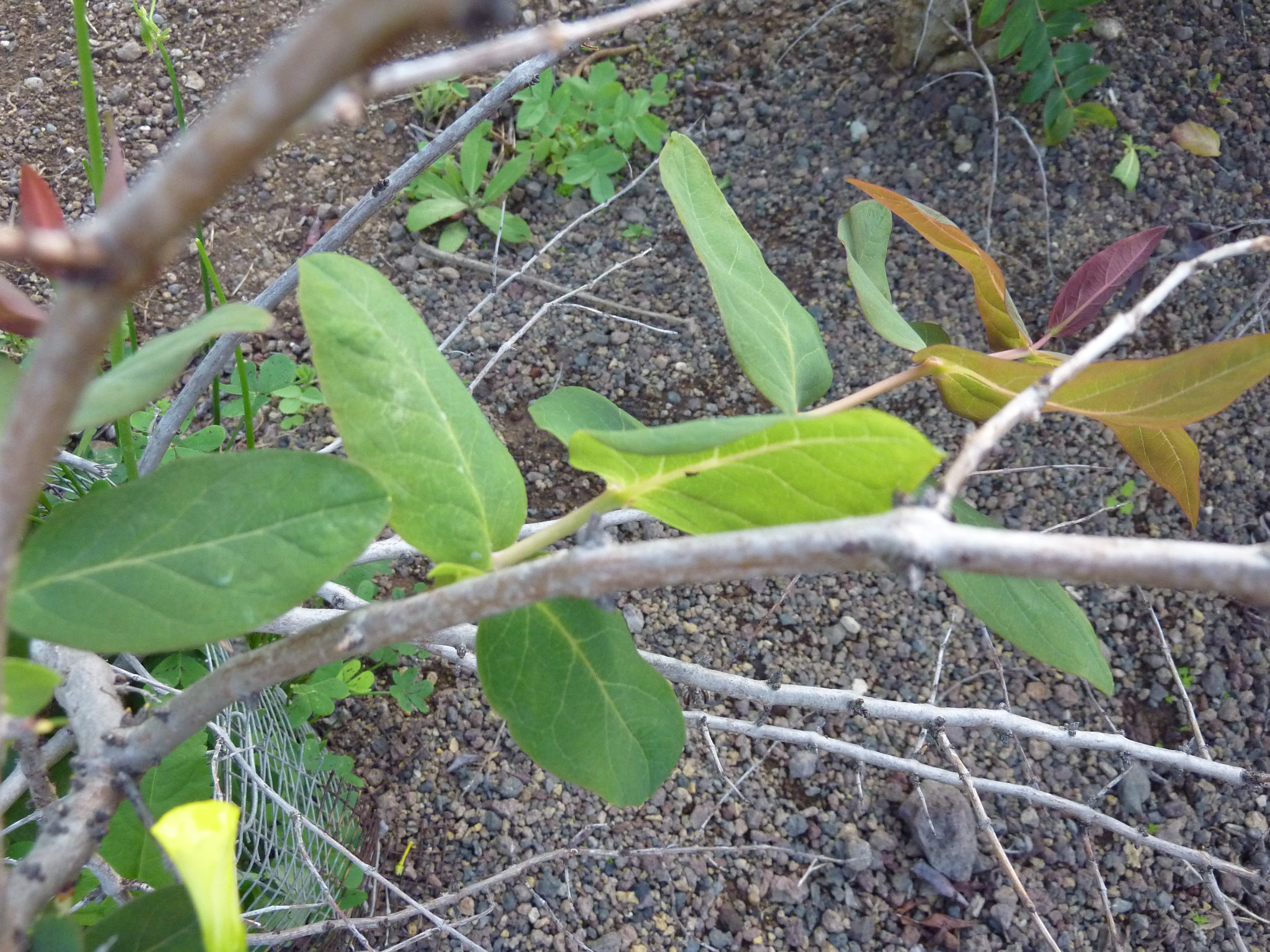
Bark, stems, and leaves

When the plant is young, the stems are somewhat flattened and have four lines that run longitudinally up their length. When it matures, they become more cylindrical and have only two lines. There are nodes with leaves every 0.2–0.4 cm along the stem. The bark on the outside of the stem is scaly.

The leaf blades are directly connected to the stem, and sometimes partially wrap around it. The blade is roughly 4–9 cm long by 2.5–4.5 cm wide and is a triangular-oval or oblong-oval shape. The end is blunt or rounded, and the base is flat or rounded. It is the same color on top and bottom and has a papery texture. There are four or five pairs of large lateral veins, and the leaf's network of tiny tertiary veins is visible on the top side. The leaf's glands are small, but they are found densely along its edges.

=== Flowering structures ===
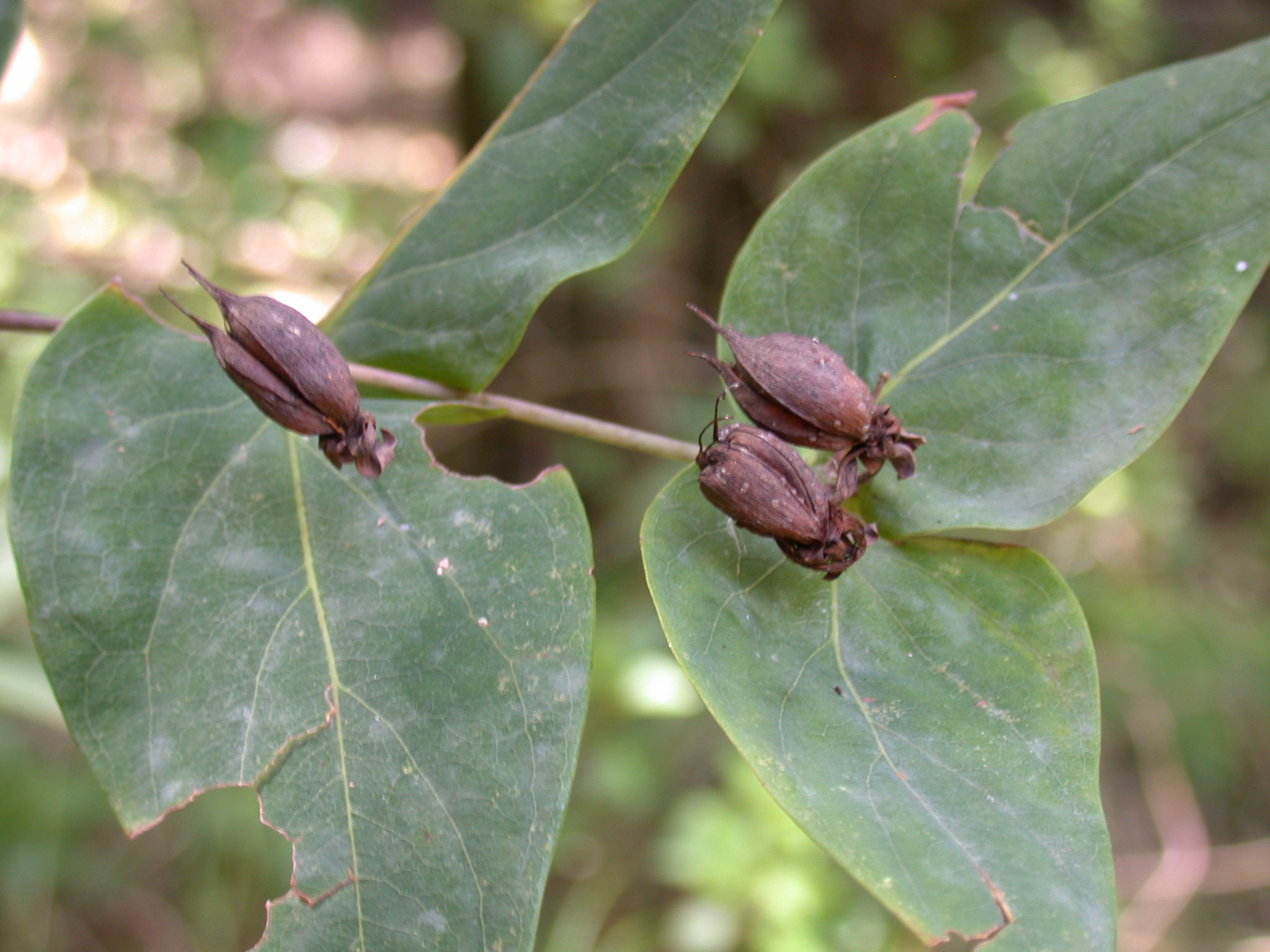
Dried and splitting fruit

Each cluster of flowers has anywhere from 1–13 individual flowers. They come from two nodes on the stem that are separated by the same distance as the leaves are from each other. The flower cluster is shaped like a wide pyramid or closer to a corymb, with the stems spreading out broadly. Sometimes there will be accessory flowers lower on the branches that carry the main clusters. Each flower is carried by a pedicel that is 0.5–1.1 cm long. The leaf-like bracts may be the same size as other leaves, or could be smaller. They are elongated and may taper to a point.

Each flower is 3–4.5 cm wide. Before blossoming, the buds are an imperfect globe shape with an end that is blunt or rounded. The sepals overlap one another and vary in size. They become larger during flowering and persist while the plant is fruiting. There are glands on the sepals in linear patterns and individual points; the glands are denser along the edges. The petals are golden yellow, measuring 1.8–2.2 cm long and 0.6–0.8 cm wide. The stamens are grouped together in bundles of around 30–40, with the longest in the bundle being around 1.5–2.0 cm long. The styles grow upright and are slender, with a narrow stigma that ends in a distinct head. The seed capsule is 0.8–1.3 cm long with a leathery texture and a pointed end. After the plant fruits, the seed capsule entirely splits. The seeds inside are yellow-brown and around 0.12 cm long, with a wing-like growth on one side and none on the ends.

=== Similar species ===
Hypericum grandifolium differs from both H. androsaemum and H. hircinum by its bigger overall size and larger leaves. It also differs from H. androsaemum by having dry fruit (as opposed to a soft and fleshy berry), and from H. hircinum by having sepals that do not fall off. It has at times been confused with Hypericum × inodorum by some botanists, which is an intermediate form of H. androsaemum and H. hircinum.

=== Chemistry ===
Hypericum grandifolium produces several secondary metabolites in detectable quantities. Hyperoside and quercitrin are found in major concentrations; chlorogenic acid, isoquercitrin, and quercetin are present in smaller concentrations. The species also has a diverse essential oil profile. Nonane and various caryophyllenes are by far the most prolific oils, but there is a wide array of compounds in more minute concentrations. These are mostly alkanes and sesquiterpene hydrocarbons.

== Taxonomy ==
Hypericum grandifolium was first formally described by Jacques Denys Choisy in 1821. He collected the species' type specimen on the island of Tenerife. This description was one of the first that dealt with Macaronesian flora spanning multiple island groups. In it, Choisy gave H. grandifolium the following brief identifying description: (Note: Translation by GPT-3.5)

Hypericum caule tereti, foliis magnis amplexicaulibus, calyce in pedunculum reflexo, corolla sublineari. Caulis fruticosus, erectus, rubricans, teres, ramosus; rami obliqui.
Hypericum with a cylindrical stem, large embracing leaves, calyx bent back on the peduncle, and sublinear corolla. The stem is shrubby, erect, reddening, cylindrical, and branching; the branches are oblique.

- "Androsaemum‑group"
  - sect. Arthrophyllum
  - sect. Triadenioides
  - - sect. Webbia
      H. canariense
    - - sect. Bupleuroides
        H. bupleuroides
      - sect. Androsaemum
        - H. androsaemum
        - - - H. hircinum
            - H. foliosum
          - H. grandifolium

Cladogram showing the phylogeny and relationships of H. grandifolium within the "Androsaemum-group" based on Meseguer et al. 2013

Confusion around the identity and properties of Hypericum grandifolium was present throughout the 19th century. Cultivated specimens in Britain were variously called H. elatum (today H. × inodorum), H. anglicum, and Androsaemum webbianum. Choisy's original description was somewhat ambiguous, and could apply to H. × inodorum as well. As such, H. grandifolium was at times considered a synonym of that species. The last name arose because the species was sometimes placed into the defunct genus Androsaemum. This placement was refuted by William Hooker in 1844, who synonymized the name A. webbianum with H. grandifolium. His reasoning was that the species did not share certain characteristics with the rest of the genus Androsaemum as it was at that time (such as their berry-like fruit). The species was included in Norman Robson's monograph of the genus Hypericum in 1984, and he placed it into the newly arranged section Adenosepalum and allied it most closely with H. foliosum. A 2013 study used Bayesian inference to establish the phylogeny and close relations of Hypericum species. Section Androsaemum, including Hypericum grandifolium, was placed into an Old World taxon called the "Androsaemum-group" with several other sections. The study also determined that H. grandifolium was most closely related to Hypericum hircinum and Hypericum foliosum.

== Distribution, habitat, and ecology ==
The native distribution of Hypericum grandifolium are the Spanish Canary Islands and the Portuguese island of Madeira. The species is also a garden plant, and has become invasive after escaping from cultivation in non-native areas. For example, it is invasive and spreading in the San Francisco Bay Area, forming dense stands that force out native plants. It was first recorded in California in 2010, and is suspected to be harmful to the native ecology by the California Invasive Plant Council. H. grandifolium has become naturalized in parts of Australia and in Chile, but is listed as a weed in other parts of Australia like South Australia and Victoria.

The species can be found at elevations of 200–1,500 meters on the Canary Islands and 400–500 on Madeira. Its habitat is among evergreen forests like those of Laurus trees. It is also present on stony hillsides and cliffsides. In areas that have been deforested by wildfire, Hypericum grandifolium is a colonizing species that grows in the years following the disturbance. It often grows alongside the shrub Ageratina adenophora in California, where both species are invasive.

Hypericum grandifolium is a host to several parasites. These include the wasp Euderomphale gomer, the rust fungus Melampsora hypericorum, and rarely the honey fungus Armillaria. H. grandifolium is capable of reproducing through its rhizomes, and can also form thickets from its rootstock. It is possible to propagate H. grandifolium form either softwood or semi-ripe cuttings.

== Research ==
The methanol-water extracts of Hypericum grandifolium exhibit moderate in vitro anticancer potential against human tumor cells that was demonstrated in laboratory testing, and among Hypericum species native to the Canary Islands H. grandifolium is the most effective in this regard. The plant's extracts were particularly effective at inducing cell death of HeLa cervical cancer. When compared to Hypericum canariense and Hypericum reflexum, the species showed the least amount of antioxidant and antimicrobial activity. It had no impact on gram-negative bacteria and only minimal impact on gram-positive bacteria. However, its essential oil extracts have demonstrated effectiveness in reducing ear and paw edemas. A review of the medicinal properties of various Hypericum species in 2015 stated that the species was one of several that was effective against drug-resistant bacteria, especially Enterococcus faecalis. In laboratory mice, the plant induced antidepressant-like effects, likely a result of its flavonoids and benzophenones, and has also demonstrated properties that restrict nociception, which could reduce pain.
