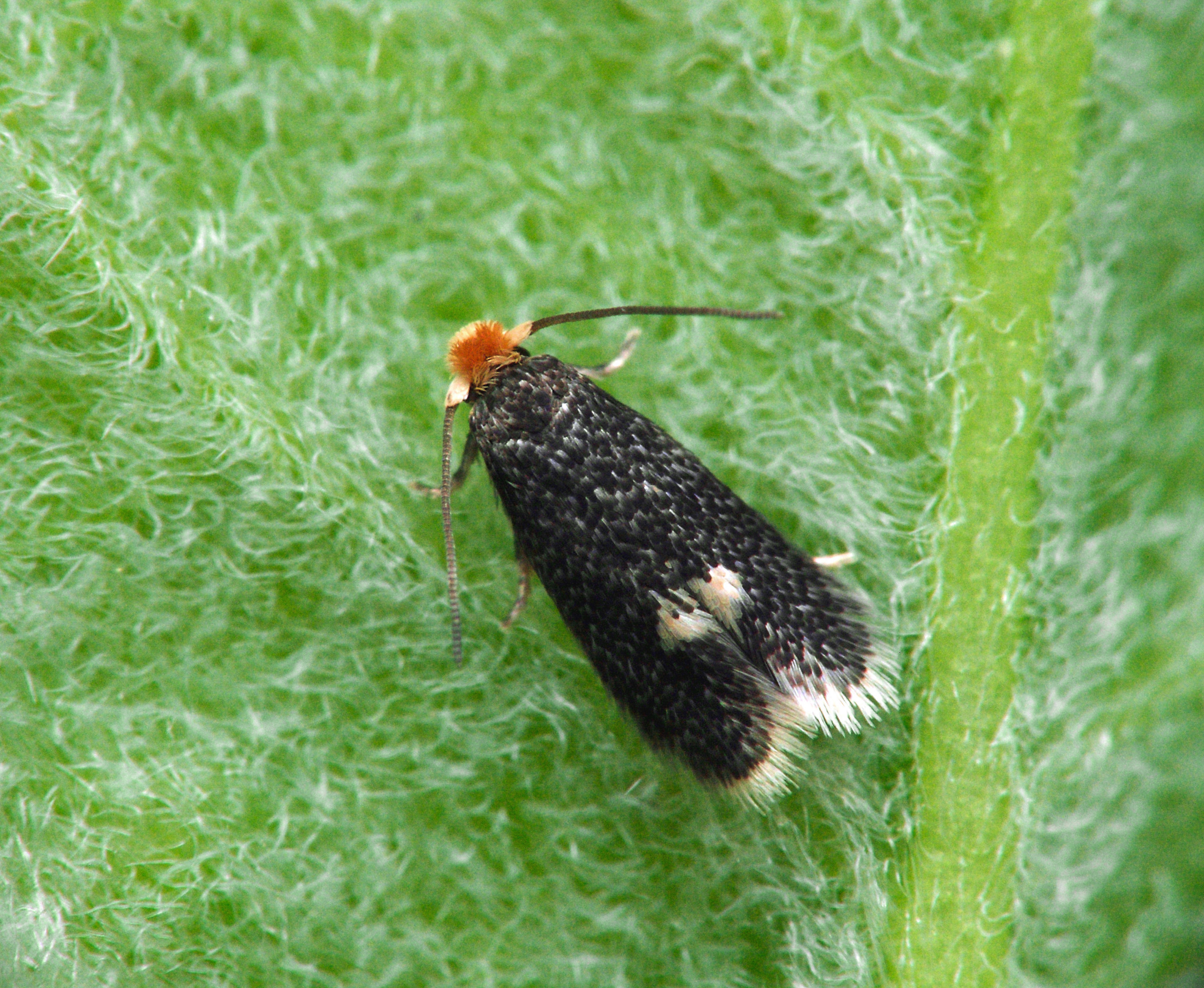
- Ectodemia septembrella, England

Scientific classification
- Kingdom: Animalia
- Phylum: Arthropoda
- Class: Insecta
- Order: Lepidoptera
- Family: Nepticulidae
- Genus: Ectoedemia
- Species: E. septembrella

Binomial name
- Ectoedemia septembrella (Stainton, 1849)

Synonyms
- Nepticula septembrella Stainton, 1849

= Ectoedemia septembrella =

Species of moth

Ectoedemia septembrella is a moth of the family Nepticulidae. It is found in most of Europe, east to the eastern part of the Palearctic realm. It is also found in the Near East.

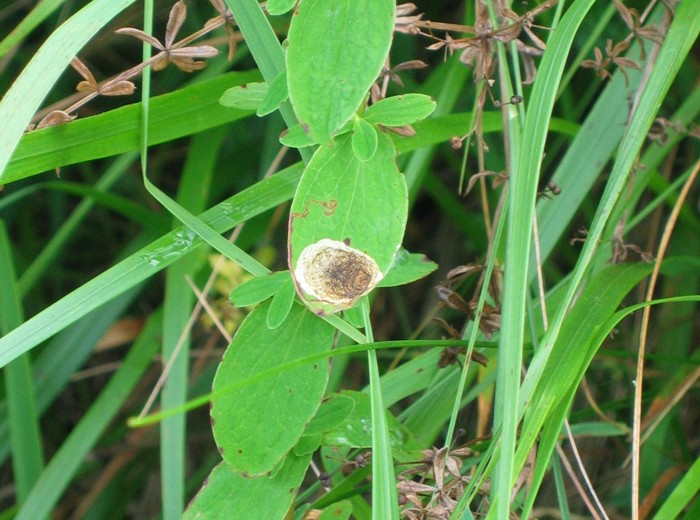
Damage

The wingspan is 5–6 mm. The head is ferruginous to ochreous with a whitish collar. The antennal eyecaps are whitish. The posterior tarsi are whitish. The forewings are dark fuscous, somewhat pale-sprinkled and with a subtriangular whitish tornal spot; tips of apical cilia whitish. The hindwings are grey.

Adults are on wing in May and June and again in August.

The larvae feed on Hypericum bupleuroides, Hypericum caprifolium, Hypericum hircinum, Hypericum hirsutum, Hypericum hookerianum, Hypericum inodorum, Hypericum maculatum, Hypericum montanum, Hypericum nummularium, Hypericum patulum, Hypericum perforatum, Hypericum rhodoppeum, Hypericum serpyllifolium, Hypericum tetrapterum, Hypericum undulatum. They mine the leaves of their host plant.
