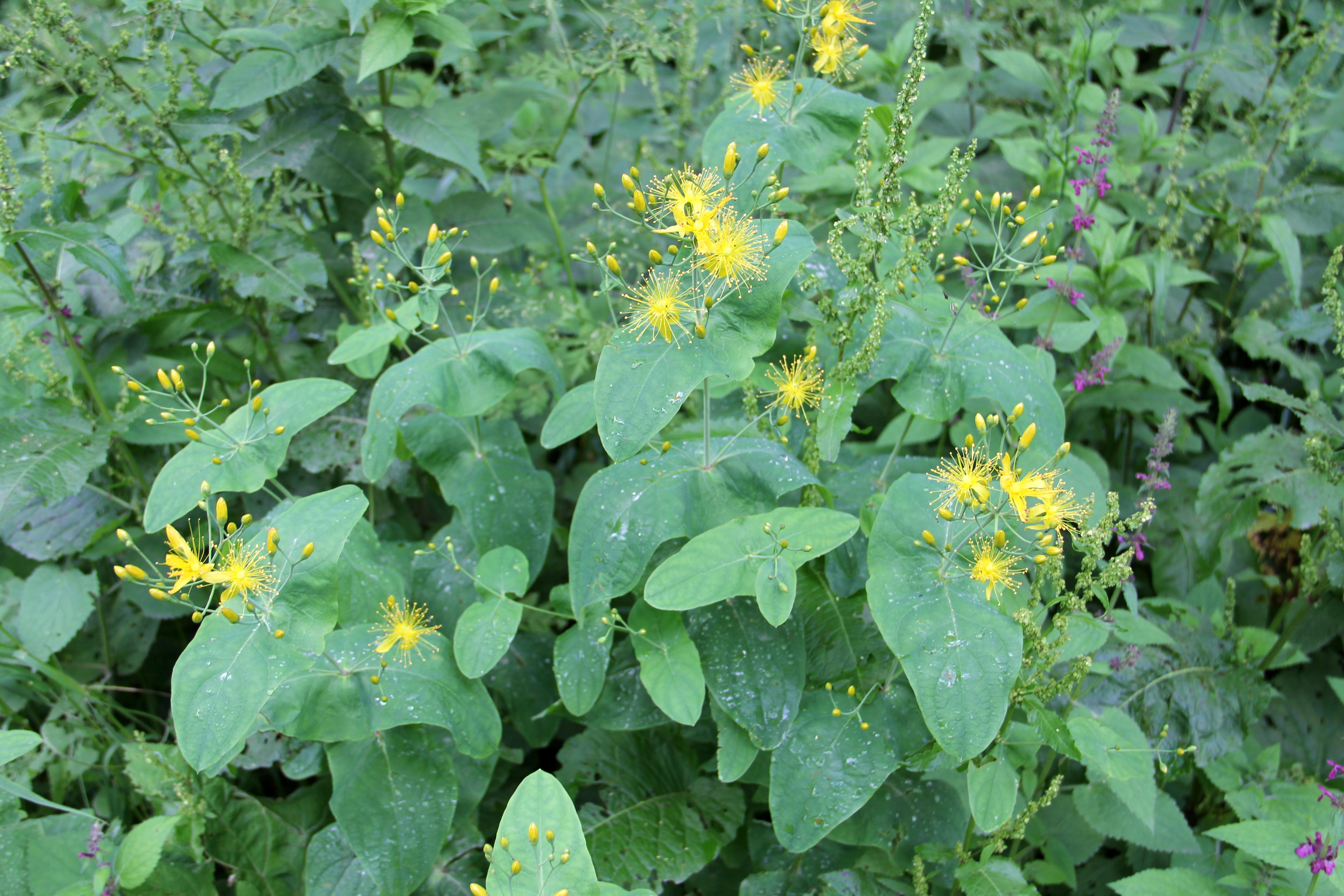
- Foliage and flowers of the species

Scientific classification
- Kingdom: Plantae
- Clade: Tracheophytes
- Clade: Angiosperms
- Clade: Eudicots
- Clade: Rosids
- Order: Malpighiales
- Family: Hypericaceae
- Genus: Hypericum
- Section: Hypericum sect. Bupleuroides; Stef.
- Species: H. bupleuroides

Binomial name
- Hypericum bupleuroides Stef.

= Hypericum bupleuroides =

Species of flowering plant in the St John's wort family

Hypericum bupleuroides is a species of perennial flowering plant in the St John's wort family, Hypericaceae. It grows 45–80 centimeters (18–31 in) tall, and notably has perfoliate leaves that are fused at the stem. It has pyramid-shaped flower clusters of 1 to 25 flowers with yellow petals in a star-shaped arrangement. The species is found along the Black Sea coast near the Turkish–Georgian border. Hypericum bupleuroides has a small distribution and specific habitat requirements that make it vulnerable to environmental pressures.

The species has a wide array of constituent chemicals, especially in its petals. These include essential oils and secondary metabolites that are common to the genus Hypericum like hypericin, hyperforin, and various phenols. It also has a greater concentration of some compounds than the type species of the genus, Hypericum perforatum, including chlorogenic acid and amentoflavone.

Hypericum bupleuroides was first fully described by Boris Stefanoff in 1932. It is the sole member of the section Bupleuroides, to which it was assigned by Norman Robson in his monograph of the genus Hypericum. It was previously thought to be most closely related to the Chinese species Hypericum elatoides, but more recent phylogenetic studies have demonstrated it has a much closer relationship to section Androsaemum and Hypericum canariense.

== Description ==
Hypericum bupleuroides is a perennial herb that grows 45–80 cm (18–31 in) tall from a single or a few stems. It lacks branches besides those attached to an inflorescence, and its base has visible roots that creep along the ground.

=== Vegetative structures ===
The stems of the species are usually circular in cross-section and lack glands. The internodes (distance of the stem between leaves) are 5–12 cm (2.0–4.7 in) long.

The most notable characteristic of the species' leaves are that they are perfoliate: the stem appears to puncture the center of the leaf. Each leaf consists of two blades that are fused at the stem. The blades vary widely in size, with a length of 7–28 cm (2.8–11.0 in) and a width of 3.7–10 cm (1.5–3.9 in), and have an oval to ellipse shape. They are paler on the underside of the blade and are a green color without a greyish tint, but are papery to the touch. The end of the leaf is either blunt or has a short point. There are four pairs of main veins that can be seen on the inner third of the blade. Many small veins that branch off are visible, but only from the top of the leaf. There are many small, pale glands on the surface of the leaf; these are also irregularly present along its edges.

=== Flowering structures ===
Each inflorescence has anywhere from 1 to 25 flowers, which grow out of 1–3 distinct nodes. The shape of the inflorescence is that of a wide pyramid. Each flower stalk is 0.8–2.5 cm long, and the bracts are 0.05–0.4 cm long. When the plant matures, these bracts wither, giving the base of the flowers a scaly appearance. The sepals are not fused together but do overlap. They vary in size even within a single flower: 0.25–0.45 cm long and 0.2–0.23 cm wide. The sepals point upwards while the plant is budding and in fruit. These sepals also have glands in linear patterns on their surface and sometimes also have reddish to black glands on their edges.

The flowers are 2.1–4 cm (0.8–1.6 in) wide and their yellow petals are arranged in a star shape. Each individual petal is 1.5–2 cm long by 0.25–0.5 cm wide, and there are around eight times more petals than there are sepals. The petals are a narrow lance-like shape but lack a point, and have the same kinds of glands as the sepals. Each flower has 50–75 stamens, the longest of these grow to 1.4–1.7 cm long, which have an amber-colored anther gland. The ovary is 0.6–0.7 cm long by 0.3 cm wide, and the styles are 1.2–1.4 cm long and are slender.

The seed capsule is 0.9–1.4 cm long by 0.5–0.8 cm wide, and its shape is roughly elliptical to roughly oval. The seed inside is a reddish brown color and is 0.12–0.15 cm long with a roughly cylindric shape that has a slight curve.

== Chemistry ==
Most species in the genus Hypericum have secondary metabolite extracts made up primarily of phytochemicals such as hypericin, hyperforin, and phenols. Previous studies of the chemical profile of Hypericum bupleuroides in 2001 and 2004 could not find hypericin or pseudohypericin. While a 2009 study did find these compounds, they were found in lower concentrations than in the genus type species Hypericum perforatum. The presence of hypericin was further confirmed by the discovery of its precursor compound skyrin in a 2020 study. The 2009 study also found hyperforin, rutin, quercitrin, and quercetin in lower concentrations than H. perforatum. Further, it found comparable amounts of hyperoside, and greater concentrations of chlorogenic acid, apigenin 7-O-glucoside, and amentoflavone. One chemical that was found in H. bupleuroides but is not present in H. perforatum is kaempferol, which may be unique within the genus to H. bupleuroides and Hypericum scabrum.

The distribution of secondary metabolites in Hypericum bupleuroides is not uniform throughout the plant. Hypericin, pseudohypericin, and hyperforin are only found in the flowers, and almost all of the previously mentioned secondary metabolites are found more densely in the flowers. The only exception is the flavonoid apigenin 7-O-glucoside, which is most concentrated in the leaves. This higher concentration in the flowers could be due to the presence of dark red oil glands on the petals, though the connection between gland color and secondary metabolite presence has not been confirmed.

Hypericum bupleuroides has a profile of at least thirty essential oils. The most common components are sesquiterpenes like sesquiphellandrene, caryophyllene, selinadiene, and elemene. Also present in comparatively lower amounts are various monoterpenes and other hydrocarbons.

=== Uses ===
Compared to related Hypericum species, like H. montbretii, Hypericum bupleuroides has a high concentration of flavonoids. These flavonoids, along with phenolic compounds, have been shown to possess antioxidant properties. Additionally, extracts from the species also have antibacterial capabilities, demonstrating a similar effect as the commercial antibiotic kanamycin A towards the bacteria hay bacillus and Candida albicans. In general, the extracts are more effective against Gram-positive than Gram-negative bacteria.

== Taxonomy ==
- H. subg. Hypericum
  - Other Old World sections
  - "Androsaemum‑group"
    - sect. Arthrophyllum
    - sect. Triadenioides
    - - sect. Webbia
        H. canariense
      - - sect. Bupleuroides
          H. bupleuroides
        - sect. Androsaemum
          - H. androsaemum
          - - - H. hircinum
              - H. foliosum
            - H. grandifolium

Cladogram showing the phylogeny and relationships of H. bupleuroides within part of Hypericum based on a 2013 study

Carl Friedrich von Ledebour was the first to mention specimens of Hypericum bupleuroides in 1837. However, he incorrectly identified it as Hypericum perfoliatum. The first reference to the modern name H. bupleuroides comes from a description of Hypericum rochelii by Johann Jakob Griesbach in 1852, in which the two species were compared to each other. The species was not given a complete assessment until 1932, when Boris Stefanoff fully described its characteristics.

In his monograph of the genus Hypericum, Norman Robson proposed that the nearest relative to H. bupleuroides was H. elatoides. He stated that H. bupleuroides was a tertiary relict of an extinct species of the genus that previously had a much greater distribution, and that would explain its close relation to H. elatoides despite the latter species' Chinese distribution. Furthermore, Robson created a monophyletic section called Bupleuroides for the species. In 2013, section Bupleuroides was affirmed to only contain Hypericum bupleuroides. The study also established other species that were most closely related to H. bupleuroides, and it was suggested that Bupleuroides should placed into an "Androsaemum-group" with several other Old World sections. This is because the species is most closely related to the members of section Androsaemum as well as Hypericum canariense and sections Arthrophyllum and Triadenioides.

== Ecology ==
Hypericum bupleuroides is distributed along the Turkish–Georgian border near the Black Sea. Its extent overlaps with that of Hypericum xylosteifolium. Specifically, H. bupleuroides is present around the city of Rize in Turkey and in Adjara in Georgia. It is found at elevations of 640–2,100 meters (2,100–6,890 ft) in damp areas of forests.

One parasite that is hosted by H. bupleuroides is the moth Ectoedemia septembrella, the larvae of which bore into the leaves of the species.

=== Reproduction ===
One method of propagation for the species that has been studied is callus induction. This process is not known to be possible for most of the 490 species in Hypericum, but it has been demonstrated to work in several, such as H. erectum, H. perforatum and H. brasiliense. Sometimes, H. bupleuroides produces calluses at the same time as new shoots, while in other conditions there are only new shoots and calluses are not formed. When there are calluses, they take the form of greenish and compact masses that weigh 27.4–32.7 milligrams. Shoots could form from these calluses when they are cultured, and depends on the origin of the callus: those taken from the internodes were much more likely to form shoots than those from the leaves. These shooted calluses are then induced to take root, and experienced an approximately 90% survival rate, even in non-lab conditions.

=== Conservation ===
Hypericum bupleuroides has a limited distribution and requires a highly specific habitat to survive, which increase its risk for extinction. Methods like propagation by callus induction could be used to re-establish the species in its native habitat and combat environmental pressures.

== Bibliography ==
- Ayan, Ali; Radušienė, Jolita; Çirak, Cüneyt; et al. (2009). "Secondary metabolites of Hypericum scabrum and Hypericum bupleuroides". Pharmaceutical Biology. 47 (9): 847–853. doi:10.1080/13880200902942436.
- Ceylan, Şule (2020). "Comparison of antioxidant and antimicrobial activities of plant extracts Centaury (Hypericum montbretii and Hypericum bupleuroides) and Blackthorn (Paliurus spina-christi Mill) in Artvin, Giresun region of Turkey". Artvin Coruh University Journal of Forestry Faculty. 21 (1): 13–20. doi:10.17474/artvinofd.579494.
- Çirak, Cüneyt; Ayan, Ali Kemal; KevseroĞlu, Kudret (2007). "Direct and indirect regeneration of plants from internodal and leaf expiants of Hypencum bupleuroides gris". Journal of Plant Biology. 50 (1): 24–28. Bibcode:2007JPBio..50...24C. doi:10.1007/bf03030596. ISSN 1226-9239. S2CID 39939532.
- Crockett, Sara; Robson, Norman (2011). "Taxonomy and Chemotaxonomy of the Genus Hypericum". Med Aromat Plant Sci Biotechnol. 5 (1): 1–13. PMC 3364714. PMID 22662019.
- Demirci, Faith; Başer, K. Hüsnü Can (2009). "Volatiles of Hypericum bupleuroides Griseb". Journal of Essential Oil Research. 18 (6): 650–651. doi:10.1080/10412905.2006.9699194. S2CID 96073409 – via ResearchGate.
- Griesbach, Johann; Schenk, August (1852). "Beitrage zur Systematik der ungarischen Flora". Archiv für Naturgeschichte. 18 (1) – via Biodiversity Heritage Library.
- Meseguer, Andrea; Aldasoro, Juan; Sanmartín, Isabel (2013). "Bayesian inference of phylogeny, morphology and range evolution reveals a complex evolutionary history in St. John's wort (Hypericum)" (PDF). Molecular Phylogenetics and Evolution. 67 (2): 379–403. Bibcode:2013MolPE..67..379M. doi:10.1016/j.ympev.2013.02.007. hdl:10261/167045. PMID 23435266 – via Elsevier.
- Nürk, Nicolai; Crockett, Sara (2011). "Morphological and Phytochemical Diversity among Hypericum Species of the Mediterranean Basin". Med Aromat Plant Sci Biotechnol. 5 (1): 14–28. PMC 3364718. PMID 22662020.
- Robson, Norman (2001). "Studies in the genus Hypericum L. (Guttiferae) 4(1). Section 7. Roscyna to 9. Hypericum sensu lato (part 1)". Bull. Nat. Hist. Mus. (London), Bot. 31 (2). doi:10.1017/S096804460200004X – via Internet Archive.
- Revuru, Bharadwaj; Bálintová, Miroslava; Henzelyová, Jana; et al. (2020). "MALDI-HRMS Imaging Maps the Localization of Skyrin, the Precursor of Hypericin, and Pathway Intermediates in Leaves of Hypericum Species". Molecules. 25 (17): 3964. doi:10.3390/molecules25173964. PMC 7504759. PMID 32878122.
