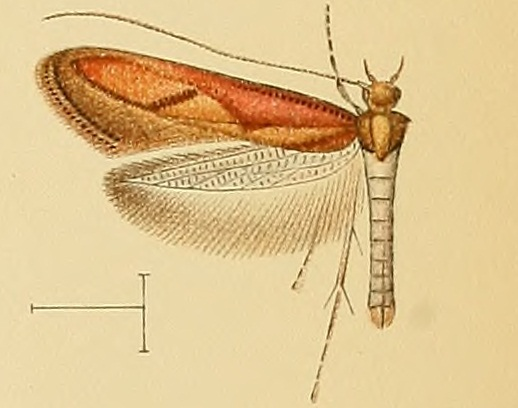

Scientific classification
- Domain: Eukaryota
- Kingdom: Animalia
- Phylum: Arthropoda
- Class: Insecta
- Order: Lepidoptera
- Family: Gracillariidae
- Genus: Caloptilia
- Species: C. aurantiaca

Binomial name
- Caloptilia aurantiaca (Wollaston, 1858)

Synonyms
- Gracilaria aurantiaca Wollaston, 1858

= Caloptilia aurantiaca =

Species of moth

Caloptilia aurantiaca is a moth of the family Gracillariidae. It is known from Madeira and the Canary Islands.

The larvae feed on Hypericum canariense, Hypericum glandulosum, Hypericum inodorum and Hypericum reflexum. They mine the leaves of their host plant.
