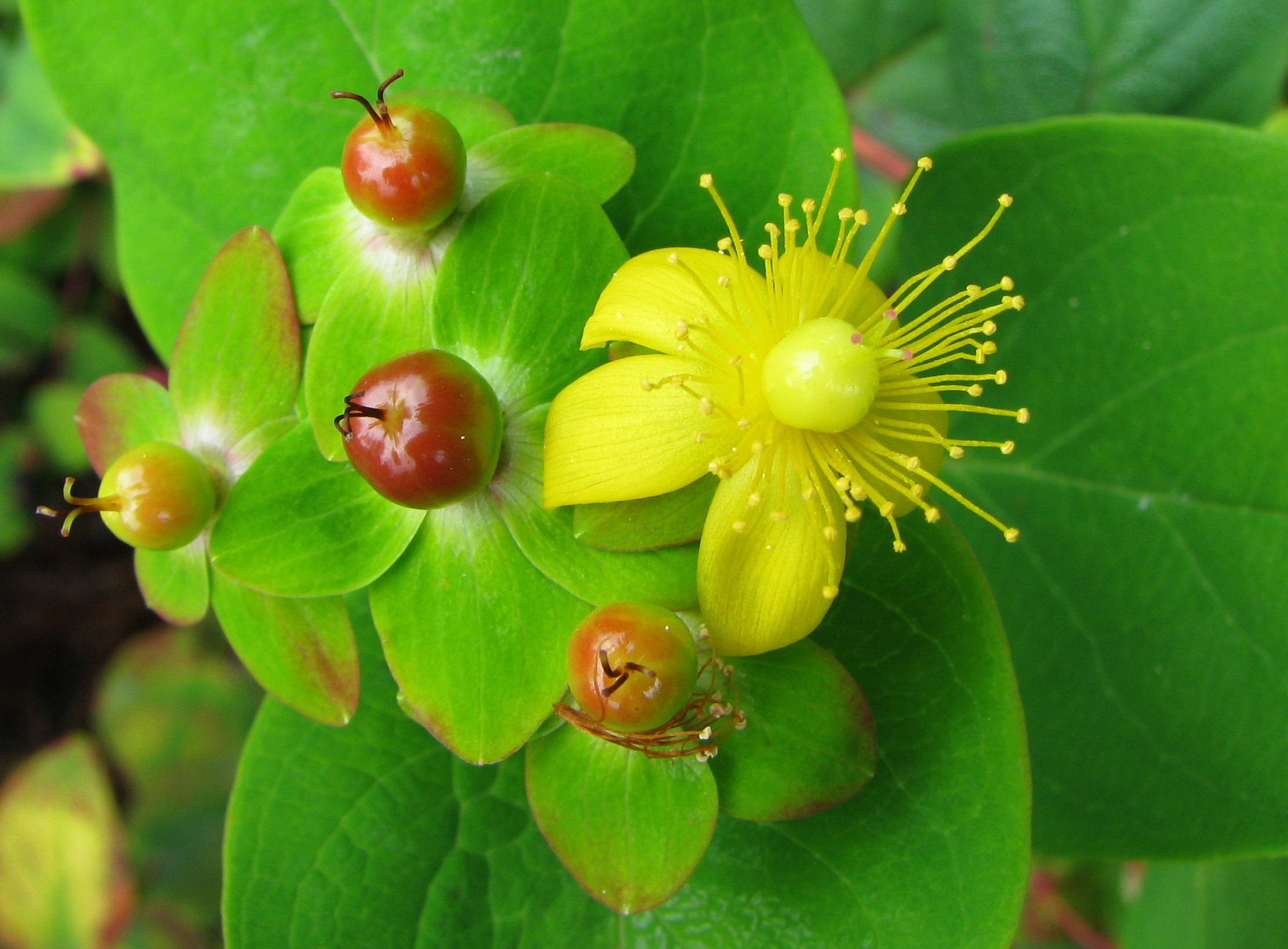
- Hypericum androsaemum, the type species of the section

Scientific classification
- Kingdom: Plantae
- Clade: Tracheophytes
- Clade: Angiosperms
- Clade: Eudicots
- Clade: Rosids
- Order: Malpighiales
- Family: Hypericaceae
- Genus: Hypericum
- Section: Hypericum sect. Androsaemum (Duhamel) Godron

Type species
- Hypericum androsaemum L.

Species
- H. androsaeumum L.; H. foliosum Aiton; H. grandifolium Choisy; H. hircinum L.; H. × inodorum Mill.

= Hypericum sect. Androsaemum =

Group of flowering plants

Androsaemum, commonly called tutsan, is a section of flowering plants in the family Hypericaceae. It is made up of Hypericum androsaemum (its type species), H. foliosum, H. grandifolium, and H. hircinum, as well as the hybrid H. × inodorum. When it was first described, it was considered its own independent genus, but was later placed under Hypericum and demoted to a section. It is also the namesake of an "Androsaemum-group" of related taxa that includes several other sections of Old World species. The Latin name Androsaemum comes from a Greek work to describe plants with red sap, and literally means "blood-man".

The members of Androsaemum are deciduous shrubs of medium size. They are characterized by their lack of hairs and by not having small dark glands. Plants possess clusters of many yellow flowers, each of which has several dozen male reproductive stamens, as well as a seed capsule that regularly dry out and split open. Extracts taken from the species have diverse profiles of essential oils. These are made up mostly of organic compounds consisting entirely of hydrogen and carbon, but they also sometimes contain high amounts of other chemicals.

The habitat of most of the species is in evergreen forests, and all but H. hircinum prefer damp shady areas. There are no species in Androsaemum that are considered to be in danger of extinction, and the section is distributed widely across Europe, Africa, and Western Asia. Its species have become invasive in numerous locations after escaping from gardens in non-native environments, including in Australia, California, and much of Western Europe.

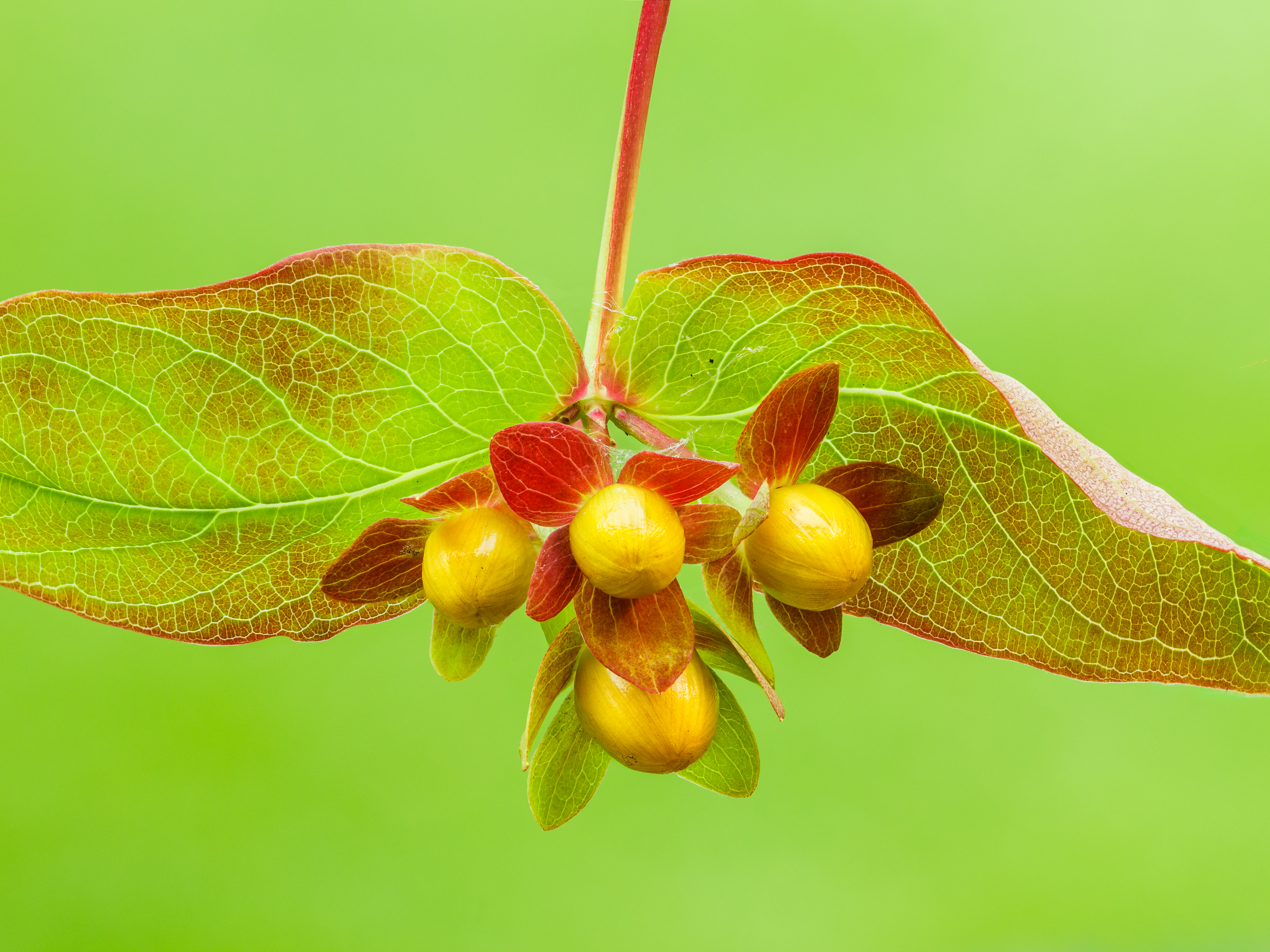
Flower buds of a (Hypericum androsaemum).

== Etymology ==
The genus name Hypericum derives from the Greek words hyper, meaning above, and eikon, meaning picture. This refers to the practice of hanging the flower "above pictures" to ward off evil spirits. The term Androsaemum derives from the Greek term androsaemus, which denoted plants possessing red sap. It is a combination of the words andros, meaning man, and haima, meaning blood. The common name tutsan is French in origin, and derives from the phrase tout-saine, which means heal-all, in reference to the medicinal properties of the plants.

== Taxonomy ==
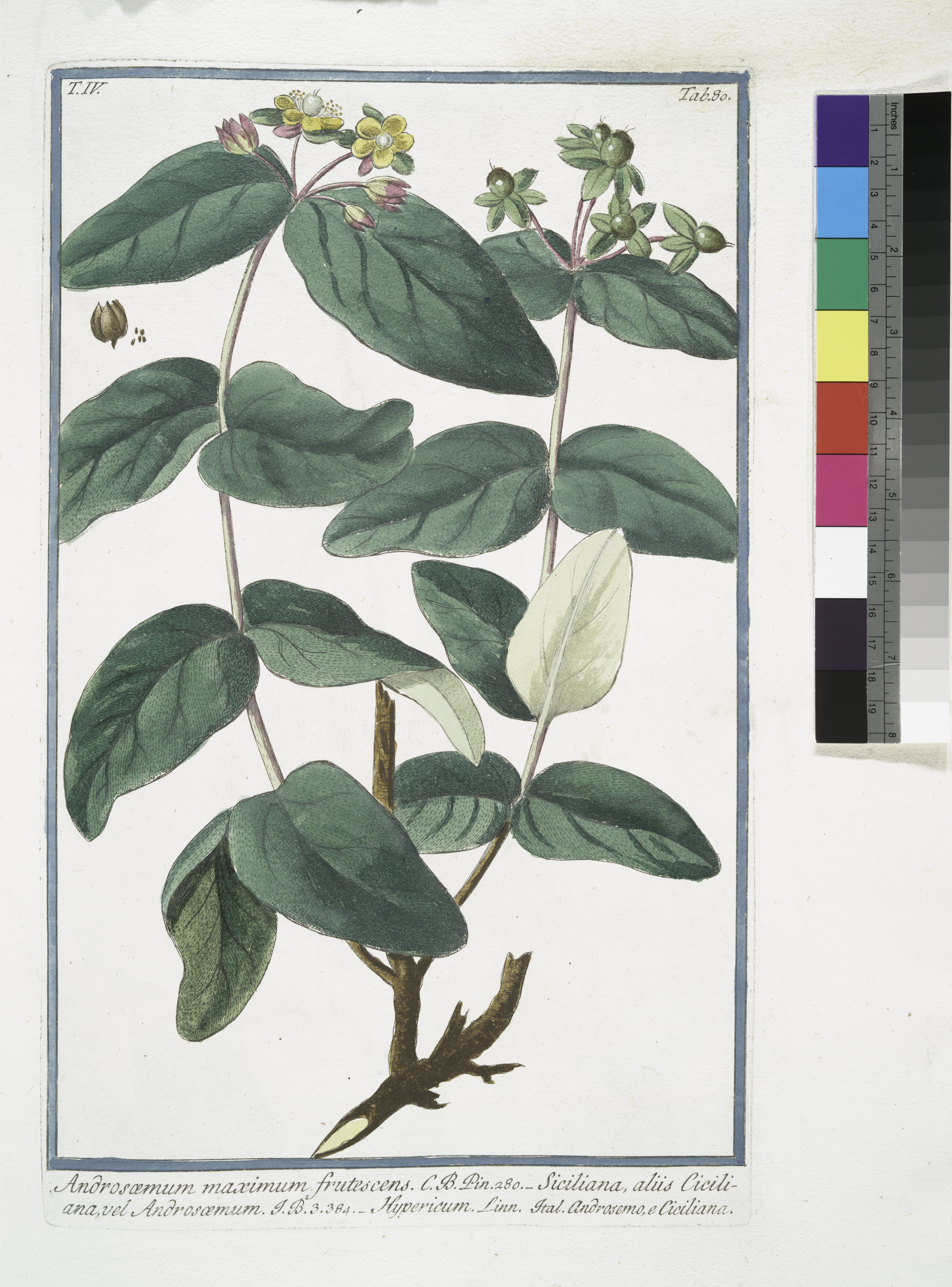
Late 18th-century illustration of a specimen called Androsæmum maximum frutescens

Androsaemum was first taxonomically described as an independent genus. It was included in the 1754 Gardeners Dictionary, with the common names "tutsan" and "park-leaves". It was stated to have one species known in England referred to as Androsæmum maximum frutescens, which was later synonymized with Hypericum androsaemum. Another early description of the genus was by Carlo Allioni in Flora Pedemontana in 1785. Using the sexual system of Linnaeus, Allioni placed the genus as most closely related to Hypericum and Croton.

The modern conception of Androsaemum as a section within Hypericum was first created in Flore de France in 1847. It included H. hircinum and H. androsaemum, and had a description that noted its berries that dry out and split. However, the status of Androsaemum as a section and not a genus was contested over the next century. A publication on botanical tautonyms (Note: A tautonym is a binomial in which the genus name is the same as the species name. The International Code of Nomenclature explicitly prohibits tautonyms for plants.) by Ernst Huth in 1893 rejected the name Hypericum androsaemum, which meant that the new and invalid name Androsaemum androsaemum would take priority.

- "Androsaemum‑group"
  - sect. Arthrophyllum
  - sect. Triadenioides
  - - sect. Webbia
      H. canariense
    - - sect. Bupleuroides
        H. bupleuroides
      - sect. Androsaemum
        - H. androsaemum
        - - - H. hircinum
            - H. foliosum
          - H. grandifolium

Cladogram showing the phylogeny and relationships of H. sect. Androsaemum within the "Androsaemum-group" based on Meseguer et al. 2013

Norman Robson included Hypericum sect. Androsaemum as one of his 36 sections of the genus Hypericum. Androsaemum was described in the 1985 installation of his monograph on the genus, in which its common characteristics were outlined, and a key was given for its four species and one hybrid. Because Robson used only morphological and geographic characteristics to organize Hypericum, further taxonomic studies were required. In 2010, cladistic analysis suggested that Androsaemum was a part of a clade called the "Myriandra-Ascyreia" group, which included those sections and several other species. The following year, a study reaffirmed the monophyletic nature of section Androsaemum, and established that H. hookerianum and H. canariense were closely related to the section. A 2013 study used Bayesian inference to establish the phylogeny and close relations of Hypericum species. Section Androsaemum was placed into a new Old World taxon called the "Androsaemum-group" along with several other sections. It also established the relationships of the species within section Androsaemum to each other.

=== Species ===
Hypericum androsaemum is the type species of the section. It was known and studied before Carl Linnaeus, but he was the first to describe it in his Species Plantarum in 1753. Several invalid synonyms were published in the following years, but the only valid synonym was Androsaemum officinale in 1785. There are two distinct infraspecific variants that have a unique appearance: H. androsaemum var. aureum has yellow-green leaves, and H. androsaemum f. variegatum has variegated leaves.

Hypericum foliosum was described by William Aiton in Hortus Kewensis in 1789. This nomenclature remained constant, with no synonyms arising following the original description.

Hypericum grandifolium was described by Jacques Denys Choisy in 1821. Throughout the 19th century, there was confusion about the identity of the species. It was confused with H. × inodorum (under the synonym H. elatum), and was also called H. anglicum and Androsaemum webbianum.

Hypericum hircinum was known as "Ascyroides", "Androsaemum foeditum", and "Tragôdes" in pre-Linnaean botany. Carl Linnaeus described the species twice, and established the current name Hypericum hircinum in Species Plantarum in 1753. The only time a synonym arose was in 1836, when Édouard Spach moved the species into the genus Androsaemum and created the new combination Androsaemum hircinum. Today, four subspecies are recognized: subsp. obstusifolium, subsp. cambessedesii, subsp. majus, and subsp. albimontanum.

Hypericum × inodorum is a hybrid of H. hircinum and H. androsaemum. The taxonomic history of the nothospecies is highly convoluted, and several aspects of it have been mischaracterized. It has two distinct appearances: one that is large-flowered and has been referred to as H. elatum, and one that is small-flowered and was called H. multiflorum. Additionally, some cultivated forms of the plant were called H. × persistens, while specimens found on the island of Madeira have been confused with H. grandifolium.

== Description ==
Species in Androsaemum are shrubs standing 30–200 centimetres (12–79 in) tall. They are deciduous and do not have hairs or dark glands. The stems branch laterally from the center and have 2–4 visible lines running along them. They are a flattened shape in cross section when the plant is young, but become more cylindrical as the plant matures. The bark varies in texture, and can be smooth, scaly, or have fissures. The leaves are situated on opposite sites of the stem, and either lack a leafstalk or have a very short one. Their edges are smooth, and they have visible veins in pairs on each side of the midrib, as well as dense tertiary veins. There are pale glands on the top and sides of the leaves, but not the bottom.

Plants usually have clusters of 3–20 flowers that grow from one or two nodes. The bracts are either similar in appearance to the leaves and persist through flowering, or are smaller and deciduous. The flowers are star-shaped with five petals and sepals. The petals are deciduous, have smooth edges, and are covered in many pale glands. There are five bundles of 20–40 stamens, with amber anther glands. There are usually three styles of the same length. The seed capsule has a leathery or papery texture, and either partially or completely dries and cracks open. The seeds inside are a cylindric shape, with unilateral wings.

Flowers of H. sect. Androsaemum

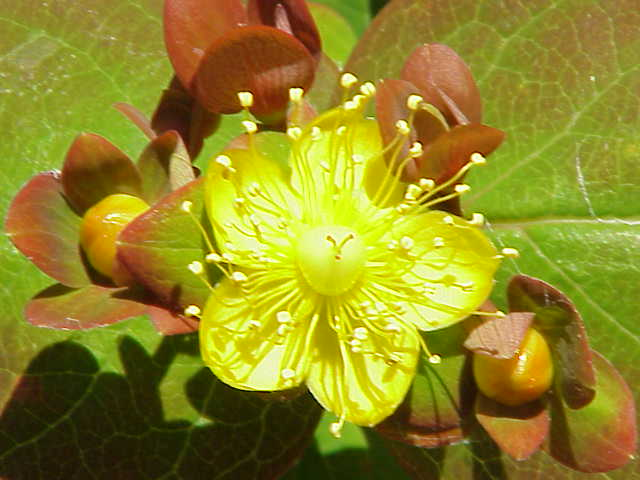
H. androsaemum

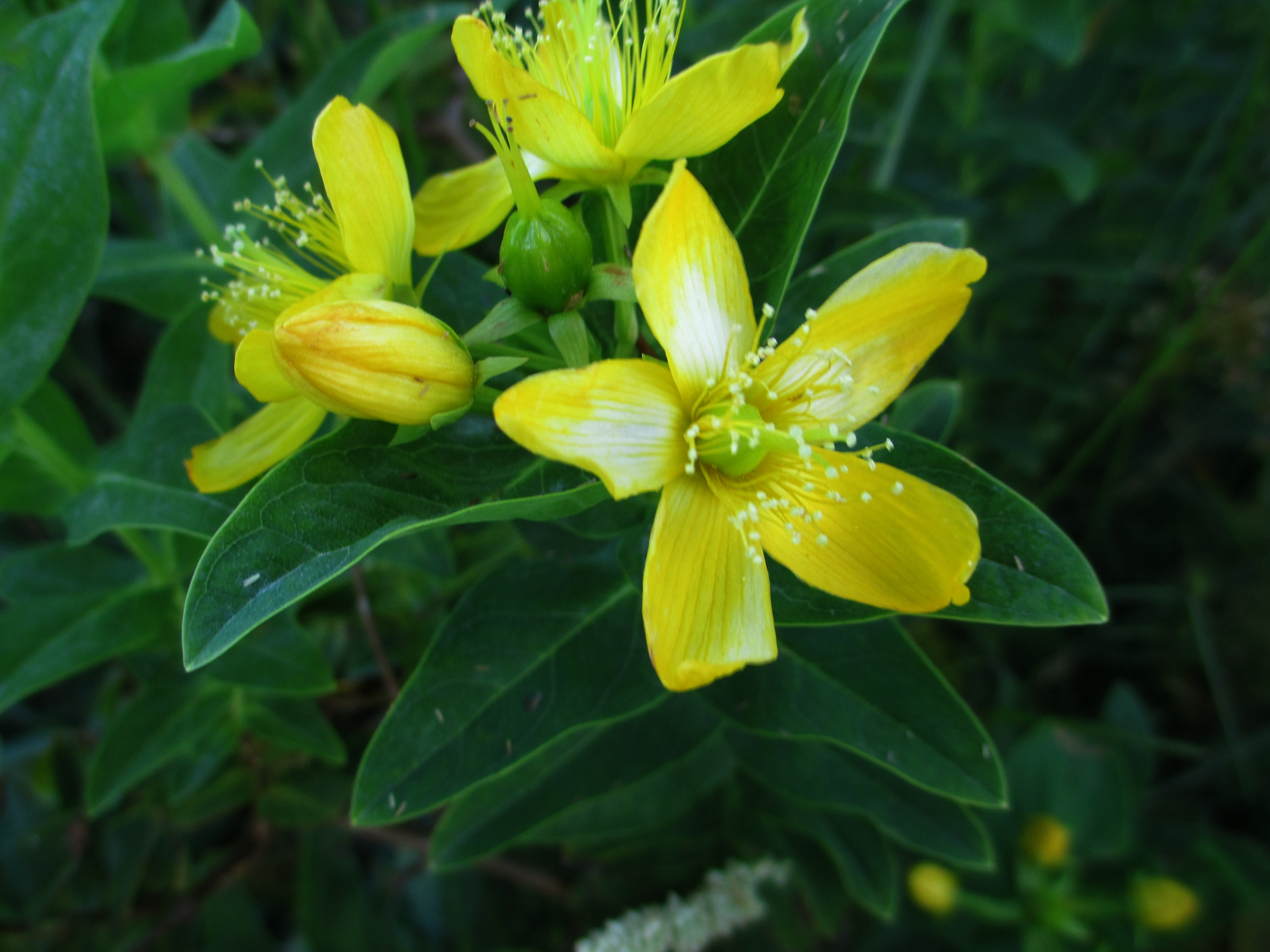
H. foliosum

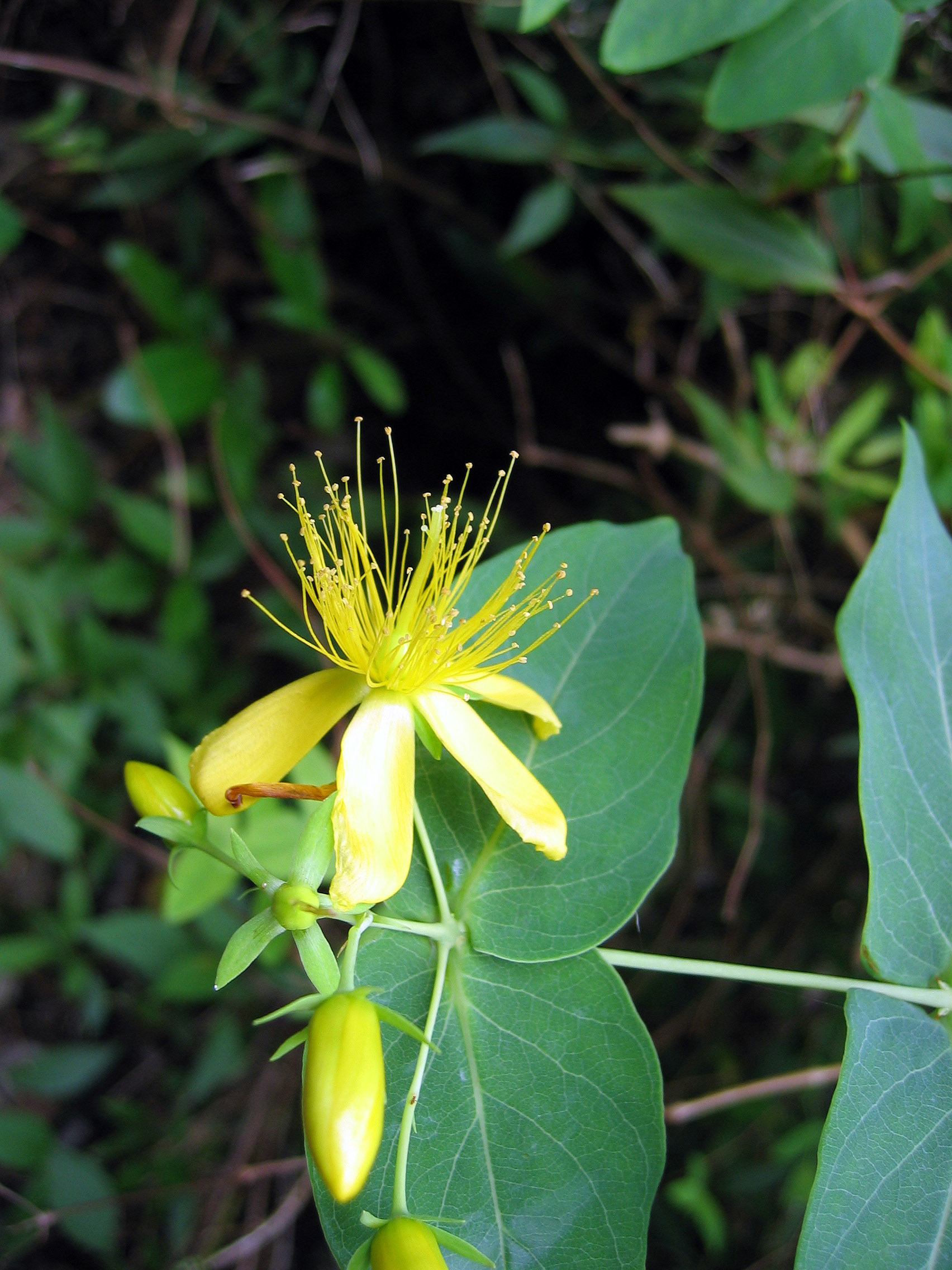
H. grandifolium

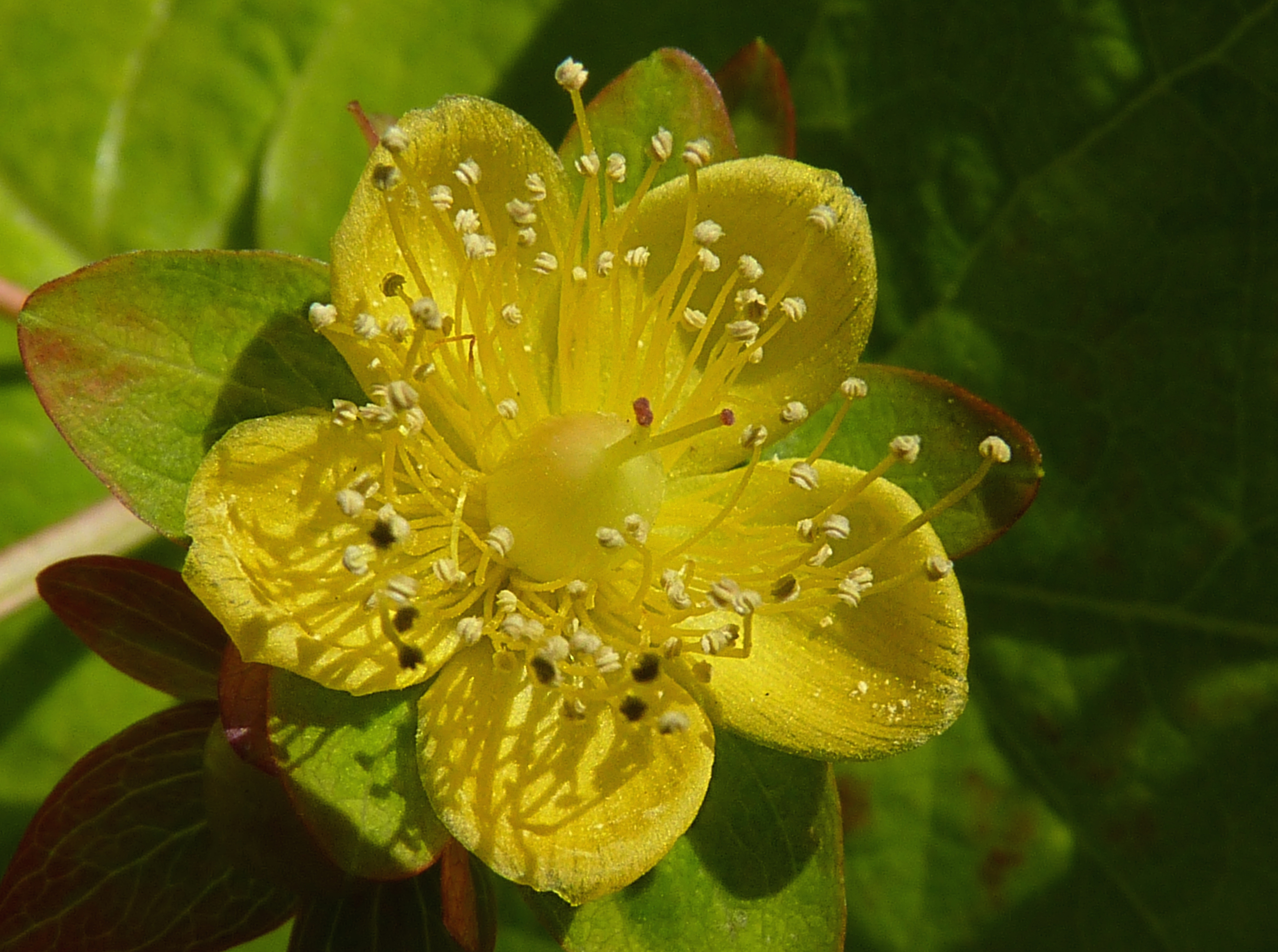
H. × inodorum

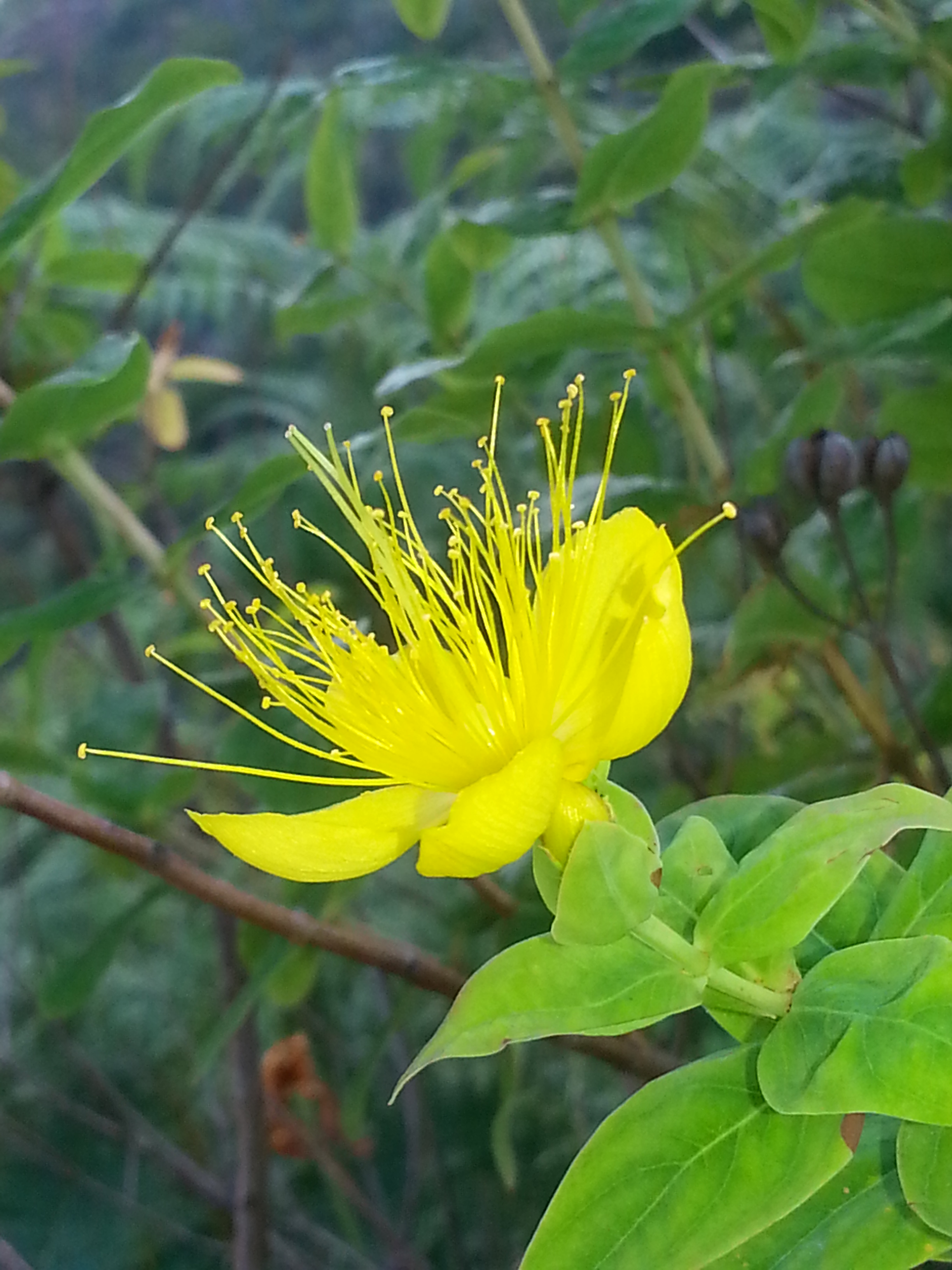
H. hircinum

Plants in the section usually have a chromosome number of 2n = 40, and are tetraploid. However, a 2006 study found that there may be variability in the chromosome number in every species of the section, with counts of 2n = 32 being regularly reported.

=== Chemistry ===
The species of section Androsaemum have a diverse profile of essential oils and other phytochemicals. Extracts from H. androsaemum are dominated by sesquiterpene hydrocarbons, those from H. foliosum by monoterpenes, H. hircinum by sesquiterpenes in the leaves and monoterpenes in the flowers, H. grandifolium by sesquiterpenes and alkanes. H. hircinum has several unique chemicals, such as amentoflavone, as well as the caproic acid that causes its goat-like smell.

== Ecology ==
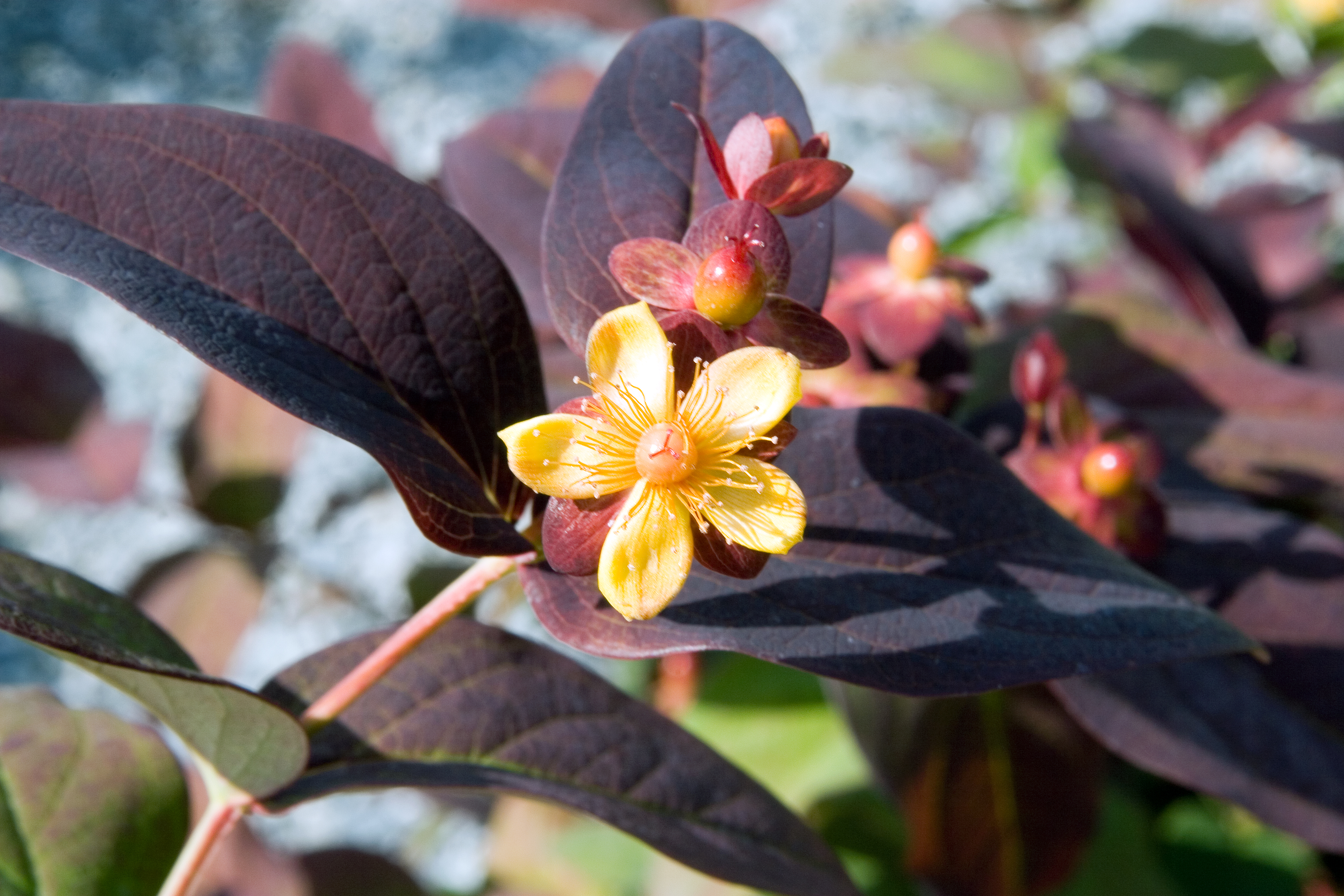
Hypericum androsaemum 'Albury Purple', a cultivar grown as an ornamental plant

Species of the section are found in evergreen forests at elevations of 200–1100 metres. H. hircinum is found in dry open areas, while all other species prefer damp shady places. The section has a wide distribution across Europe, Africa, and Asia. Species are found in Macaronesia, Northwest Africa, Western and Southern Europe, Greece, Turkey, the Caucasus, Iran, Turkmenistan, the Levant, and Saudi Arabia.

All four species are highly prolific, and are not endangered. Because they are widely cultivated as garden plants, they are prone to escaping captivity and becoming invasive. For example, H. androsaemum has been dispersed across Australia and New Zealand after being introduced by the Royal Horticultural Society, while H. grandifolium is rapidly spreading in the San Francisco Bay Area and is displacing native species. This propensity for invasiveness is likely due to their ability to quickly colonize open spaces, like H. foliosum in deposits of volcanic ash and man-made clearings. Sometimes, the species become naturalized and integrate into their new environments, as H. hircinum has in Spain, France, and Sicily.

== See also ==
- Apocynum androsaemifolium is a species of plant that takes its name from Androsaemum and the suffix -folium, meaning "leaves like that of Androsaemum".
- Psorospermum androsaemifolium is species of plant in the family Hypericaceae with the same specific epithet.
