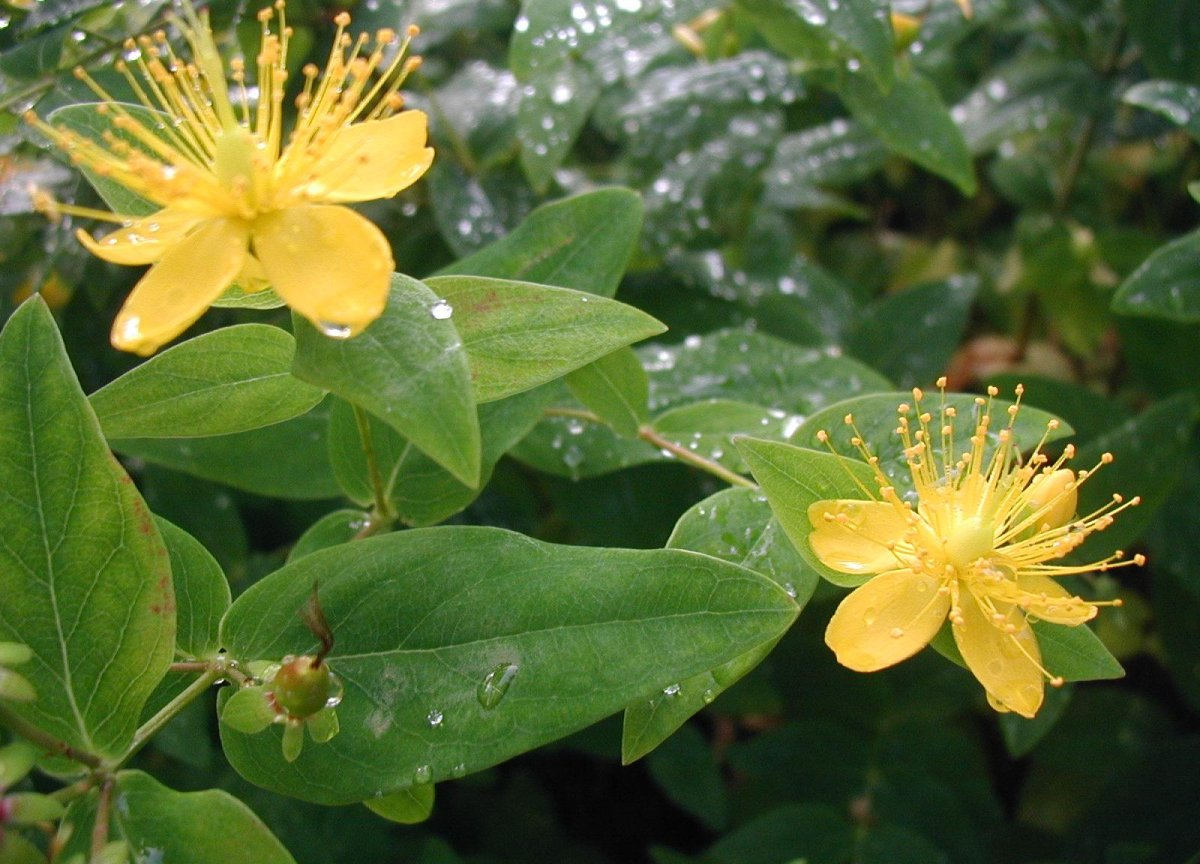

Scientific classification
- Kingdom: Plantae
- Clade: Tracheophytes
- Clade: Angiosperms
- Clade: Eudicots
- Clade: Rosids
- Order: Malpighiales
- Family: Hypericaceae
- Genus: Hypericum
- Section: Hypericum sect. Androsaemum
- Species: H. hircinum

Binomial name
- Hypericum hircinum L.

Synonyms
- Androsaemum hircinum (L.) Spach

= Hypericum hircinum =

Species of flowering plant

Hypericum hircinum is a species of perennial flowering plant in the St John's wort family, Hypericaceae. It is known as goat St John's wort and stinking tutsan; both names refer to the plant's distinctive odor. The species is a bushy shrub that can grow up to 1.5 meters tall, is many-stemmed, and has golden yellow flowers with conspicuous stamens. The plant has been well-documented in botanical literature, with mentions dating back to at least 1627. Carl Linnaeus described H. hircinum several times, including in his 1753 Species Plantarum which established its binomial. At one point the plant was placed into the defunct genus Androsaemum, but it was returned to Hypericum by Norman Robson in 1985.

Hypericum hircinum is continuously distributed across the Mediterranean and parts of the Middle East. It has also been cultivated throughout Europe, and has become naturalized in several places where it escaped captivity. The species is highly variable in appearance, but its lack of geographic separation means that five subspecies have been established to account for its diversity. H. hircinum has been hybridized with the closely related H. androsaemum to produce the fertile nothospecies H. × inodorum, which lacks the goat-like smell of H. hircinum.

While Hypericum hircinum lacks the high concentrations of several phytochemicals found in other members of its genus, it still has a highly active and useful chemical profile. Extracts from the species contain the highest levels of chemicals when taken from the flowering structures during the fruiting period of the plant. They have been used in folk medicine to treat respiratory diseases by ingestion, and it is also applied topically to treat burns and muscle ailments. Modern evaluations have demonstrated the plant's effectiveness as an antioxidant, anti-collagenase (for cosmetic care), and antimicrobial agent.

== Description ==
Hypericum hircinum is a perennial shrub that usually grows 0.6–0.9 meters tall, but can reach heights of 1.5 meters. It is bushy in shape, with many stems.

=== Vegetative structures ===
The base of the plant does not have exposed roots, but does branch directly from the ground. The stems vary in their arrangement, and can grow straight up, reach outwards, or droop to the ground. They are flat when the plant is young, but become more cylindrical as it matures. Their bark has long grooves and is grey-brown in color. The distance between each leaf is 0.2–0.9 centimeters long.

The leaves are directly connected to the stem without a stalk, and sometimes envelop the stem. Their blades are a wide triangular lance-like shape with a rounded point. They are paler in color on their undersides and have a leathery or papery texture. There are several pairs of main lateral veins on the blade, and the many small tertiary veins are visible from either side of the leaf. There are small glands on the leaf, which are most dense near the edges of the blade.

=== Flowering structures ===
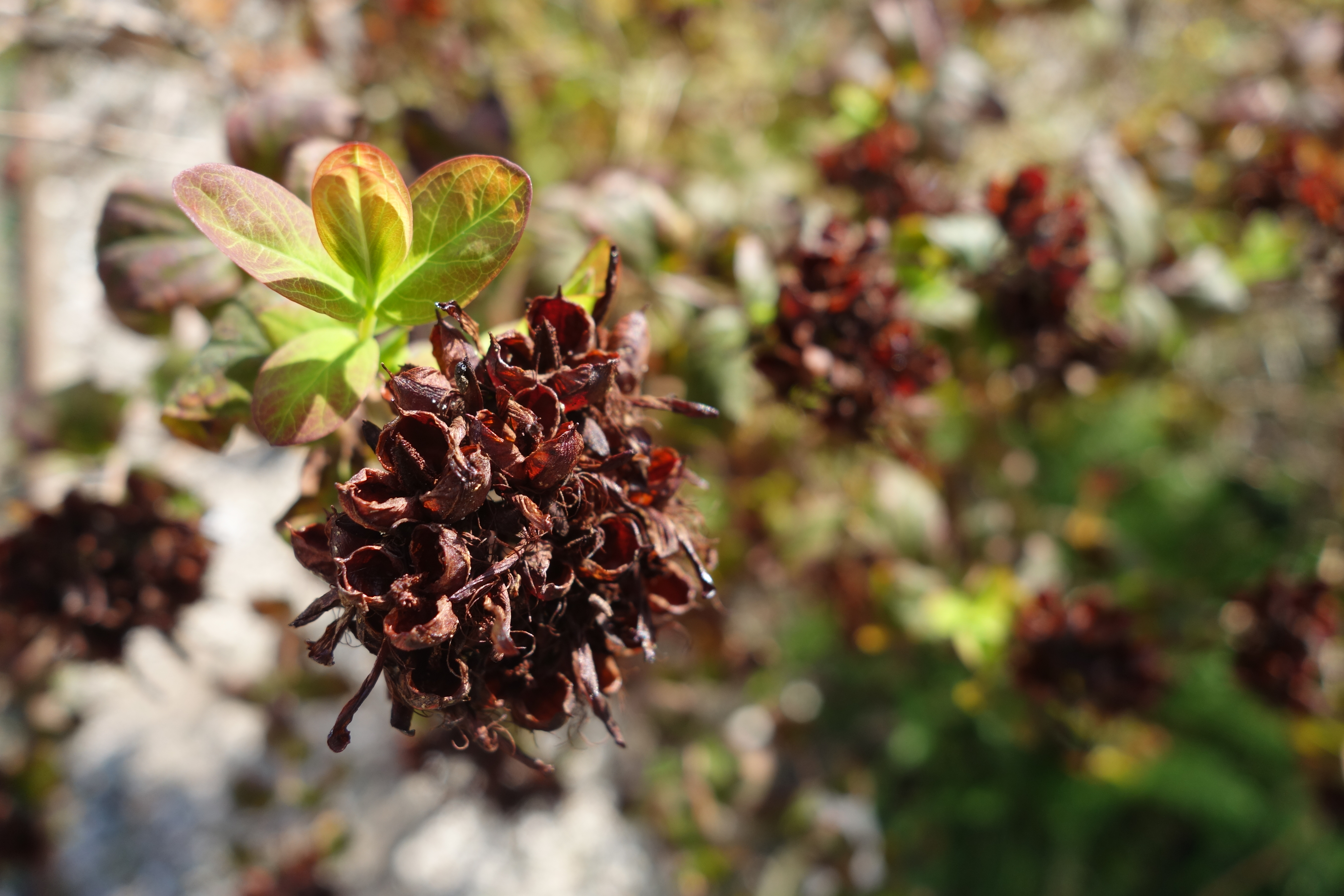
Hypericum hircinum in fruit

There are usually around three clusters of flowers on each plant with roughly twenty flowers each. The structure of the flower cluster is a wide pyramid. The flowers themselves are 2–4 cm in diameter, and are more or less globe-shaped when they are budding. The sepals around the flowers vary in size, and are lance-like in shape. They grow larger during the flowering period, but fall off before the fruit ripens. They have glands both on their surface and more densely along their edges.

The flower petals are golden yellow without any tint of red. They are 1.1–2.1 cm long and 0.4–0.9 cm wide, and they are roughly 3–4 times as large as the sepals. The stamens are bundled together in groups of around twenty, the longest of which are 1.2–2.2 cm long; this is conspicuously longer than the petals. The ovary is ellipse-shaped, and has upright styles that are 3–5 times its length. The seed capsule changes from green to dull brown as the plant matures, and the seeds are an orange to reddish brown color.

== Chemistry ==
While most species of Hypericum contain high concentrations of the phytochemicals hypericin and pseudohypericin, Hypericum hircinum may contain only trace amounts of them, and only in its flowers. However, it does contain high concentrations of other compounds that are not found in large amounts in related species, especially amentoflavone. Other isolated compounds include chlorogenic, caffeic, and neochlorogenic acid, smaller amounts of hyperforin and adhyperforin, and dihydroxybenzoic acid. The species' characteristic goat-like smell is caused by the presence of caproic acid in its leaves.

The concentration and composition of essential oils varies by the part of the plant. For example, the major hydrocarbons in the leaves and flowers are sesquiterpenes, while those of the flowers are monoterpenes. Some dominant compounds of the oil include guaiene, selinene, limonene, and pinene. The most active and useful oil components have the highest concentrations when harvested while the plant is fruiting.

== Taxonomy ==
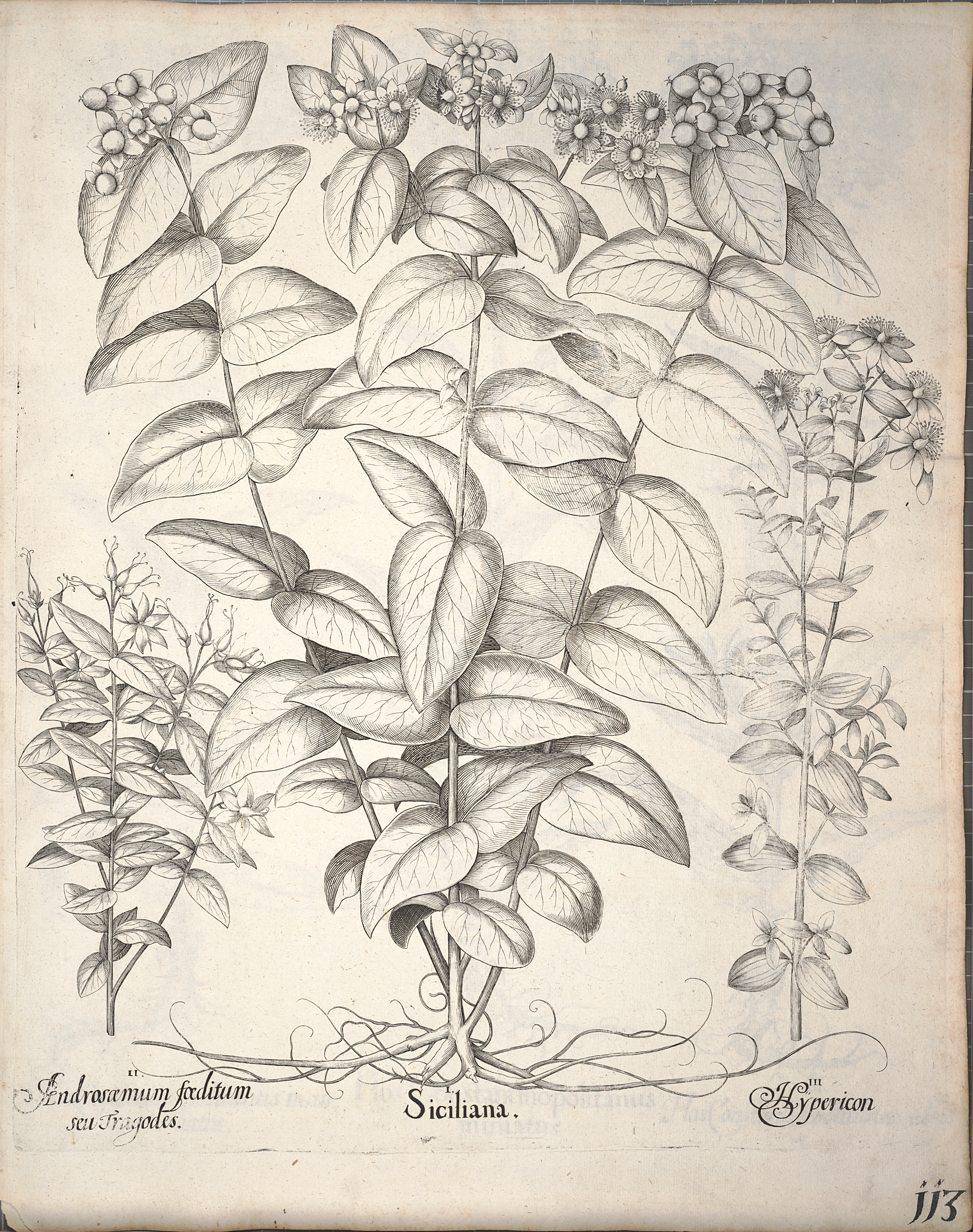
The species in Hortus Eystettensis. The inscriptions read (from left to right): Androsaemum foeditum seu Tragôdes, Siciliana, Hÿpericon.

The plant today known as Hypericum hircinum was well-studied and documented before the modern system of botanical nomenclature was established. For example, the plant may have been mentioned under the name "Ascyroides" as early as 1627 in Prospero Alpini's De plantis exoticis. Additionally, it was depicted in the 1640 volume of Hortus Eystettensis, a book of botanical illustrations. In the codex, the plant was noted to be from Sicily, of the grouping Hÿpericon (an early version of Hypericum), and called "Androsaemum foeditum" or "Tragôdes". In Carl Linnaeus' early work Hortus Cliffortianus, the name "Ascyroides" was synonymized with several others, and Linnaeus gave the species the following polynomial description:

Hypericum floribus trigynis, staminibus petalo longioribus caule fruticoso.
St John's wort with trigynous flowers on a bushy stem, and petals longer than the stamens.

In his later work Species Plantarum, which established the modern system of binomial nomenclature for plants, Linnaeus again described the species. This time, he did so using the currently accepted two-part name Hypericum hircinum. He refined its short description, and noted several previous names for the plant, including variations of Androseamum foetidum, Hypericum foetidum, and Tragium. After its original Linnaean treatment, there was only one time when a synonym for Hypericum hircinum arose. In 1836, Édouard Spach created the new genus Androsaemum (Androsème in French) out of several species from Hypericum. The specific epithet hircinum was retained, creating the new combination Androsaemum hircinum for the species.

- "Androsaemum‑group"
  - sect. Arthrophyllum
  - sect. Triadenioides
  - - sect. Webbia
      H. canariense
    - - sect. Bupleuroides
        H. bupleuroides
      - sect. Androsaemum
        - H. androsaemum
        - - - H. hircinum
            - H. foliosum
          - H. grandifolium

Cladogram showing the phylogeny and relationships of H. hircinum within the "Androsaemum-group" based on a 2013 study

The species was brought back to Hypericum by Norman Robson in his monograph of the genus. Robson did not recognize Androsaemum as a genus-level taxon and reduced it to one of 36 new sections within Hypericum. Thus, Hypericum hircinum was assigned to Hypericum sect. Androsaemum in 1985.

A 2013 study used Bayesian inference to establish the phylogeny and close relations of Hypericum species. Section Androsaemum, including Hypericum hircinum, was placed into an "Androsaemum-group" with several other sections. The study also determined that H. hircinum was most closely related to Hypericum foliosum.

=== Etymology ===
The genus name Hypericum is possibly derived from the Greek words hyper (above) and eikon (picture), in reference to the tradition of hanging the plant over religious icons in the home. The specific epithet "hircinum" comes from the Latin word "hircīnus" and refers to something "of or relating to a he-goat". Another term used by early botanists to name the species was "foetidum", which comes from the Latin word "foetĭdus" and means a foul or fetid odor.

In the United Kingdom, the species is known as stinking tutsan. It is also called goat St John's wort. Both are in reference to the distinctive goat-like and foul smell of the plant.

=== Subspecies ===
While Carl Linnaeus did not denote any subspecies in his descriptions of Hypericum hircinum, it was later determined that he described specimens of the subspecies obtusifolium, which was later designated as the type subspecies hircinum. In addition to his specific description of Hypericum hircinum, Norman Robson also streamlined its infraspecific organization. He determined that the ancestral form of the species could be found in the eastern Mediterranean and Saudi Arabia, while more modern subspecies are present on the Mediterranean islands, in Greece, and in Morocco. Because of the species' high variability in appearance but lack of geographic discontinuity, Robson acknowledged that there are at least five subspecies of H. hircinum.

Hypericum hircinum subsp. hircinum is the type subspecies, and was previously named subsp. obstusifolium or described as vartiety minus or pumilum. It is found on the islands of Sardinia and Corsica, but has also been cultivated in Holland and Britain. Today, the taxon is considered to be rare. H. h. subsp. majus is the most common subspecies, found around the Mediterranean and naturalized in Britain. It grows larger than other plants of the species, up to 1.5 meters tall. H. h. subsp. cambessedesii of the Balearic Islands was once considered its own species in the defunct genus Androsaemum. It has smaller leaves and flowers than the other subspecies. H. h. subsp. albimontanum is only found on Cyprus and several Greek islands, including Crete. H. h. subsp. metroi is very similar in appearance to subsp. majus, but lacks the distinct goat-like smell of the species.

=== Hybridization ===
Hypericum hircinum can be crossed with Hypericum androsaemum to produce the fertile hybrid Hypericum × inodorum. This hybrid differs in appearance in that its sepals remain on the flower through its period of fruiting. It also lacks the goat-like smell of H. hircinum, hence the specific epithet inodorum from the Latin word "inodōrus" which indicates a lack of fragrance.

== Ecology ==
Carl Linnaeus noted the presence of Hypericum hircinum in Sicily, Calabria, and Crete in the 18th century; Édouard Spach stated in 1836 that it was found in "southern Europe and the East". Today, the species is recorded as native in Saudi Arabia, Jordan, Syria, Cyprus, Turkey, Greece, Italy, France, Spain, and Morocco. It has also been introduced to the Balkans, Portugal, and the British Isles. Its habitat is in areas that are damp and shady along riversides, generally at elevations of 300–1200 meters.

Hypericum hircinum has been cultivated across much of Europe. The species is highly prone to escaping from this cultivation, and has become integrated into the native ecosystems of numerous areas, especially in Spain, France, and Sicily.

== Uses ==
The use of Hypericum hircinum as an ornamental plant dates back to at least 1836. The species is also frequently used in folk medicine, especially for the treatment of respiratory diseases. For example, it is used in Italy to treat persistent colds, asthma, and coughing. The plant is also used topically, with its oil applied to skin burns and its extracts used to relieve rheumatism and other muscular ailments.

Formal scientific studies have confirmed some of Hypericum hircinum's medicinal properties. It has greater antioxidant capabilities than the well-studied Camellia sinensis, due largely to the presence of flavonols, flavanones, and caffeoylquinic acids. It also contains anti-collagenase components, which could lead to future use in cosmetic products. The antimicrobial properties of the species have also been validated, and it is particularly effective against various Candida fungus species and the bacterium Streptococcus mutans. H. hircinum is also effective against other species of fungi, and lacks the cytotoxic effects in humans that other antifungal treatments may cause.
