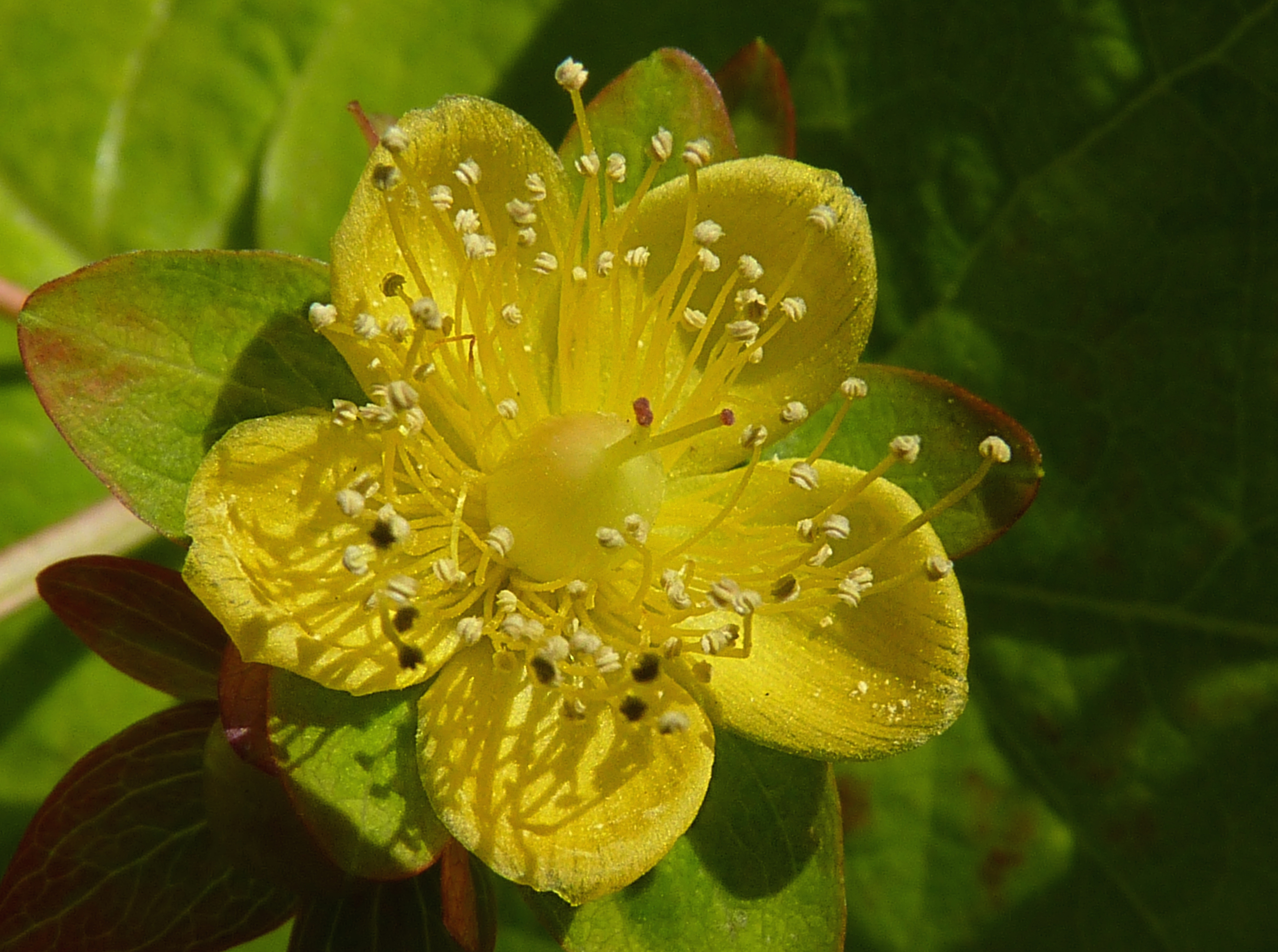
- Hypericum × inodorum 'Golden Beacon' in Belgium

Scientific classification
- Kingdom: Plantae
- Clade: Embryophytes
- Clade: Tracheophytes
- Clade: Angiosperms
- Clade: Eudicots
- Clade: Rosids
- Order: Malpighiales
- Family: Hypericaceae
- Genus: Hypericum
- Section: Hypericum sect. Androsaemum
- Species: H. × inodorum

Binomial name
- Hypericum × inodorum Mill.

Synonyms
- H. elatum Aiton; Androsaemum pyramidale Spach; A. parviflorum Spach; H. anglicum Bertol.; H. multiflorum Dippel; H. × urberugae P. & S. Dupont; H. persistens I.F. Schneider

= Hypericum × inodorum =

Hybrid flowering plant in the St John's wort family

Hypericum × inodorum, called tall tutsan or the tall St John's wort, is a bushy perennial shrub with yellow flowers native to Western Europe. It has been known since 1789, but confusion around its name, identity, and origin persisted throughout the 19th and 20th centuries.

The nothospecies is a fertile hybrid of Hypericum androsaemum and Hypericum hircinum, and a member of the family Hypericaceae. It possesses clusters of many golden yellow flowers with long stamens and red fruit that gradually changes color. It is frequently cultivated for garden display, with numerous cultivars sold for their various unique characteristics. A noted variety is 'Golden Beacon', which won the Royal Horticultural Society's Award of Garden Merit for its gold foliage, prominent stamens, pink stems, and superior disease resistance.

== Etymology ==
The genus name Hypericum is possibly derived from the Greek words hyper (above) and eikon (picture), in reference to the tradition of hanging the plant over religious icons in the home. The hybrid's author, Philip Miller, chose the name inodorum (which comes from the Latin word inodorus meaning odorless or "unscented") to distinguish it from H. hircinum, which commonly has a goat-like smell. However, the name can be misleading, as some plants of the hybrid still have a strong scent. The hybrid has historically been called tall tutsan or the tall St John's wort in English.

== Taxonomy ==
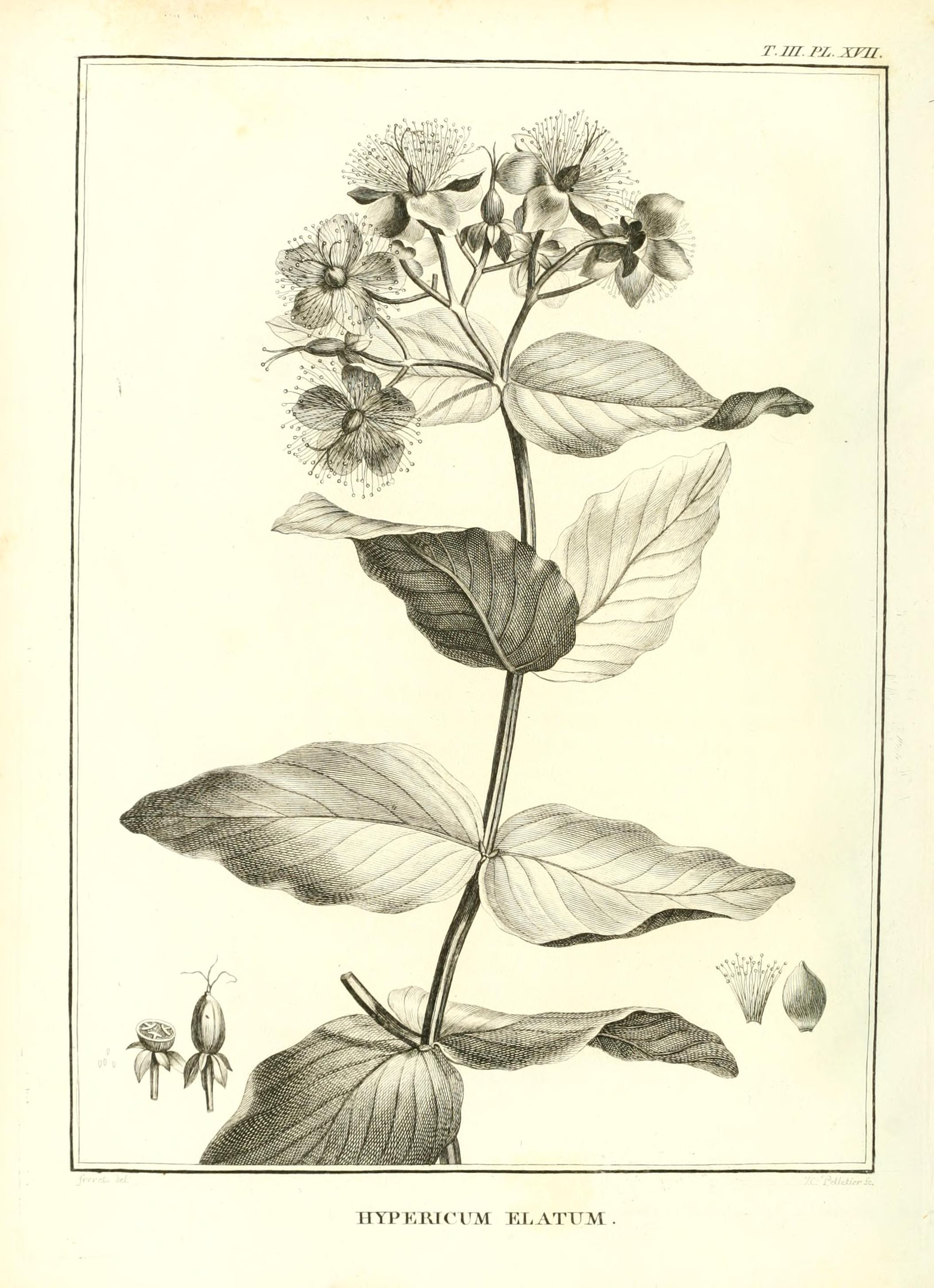
An 1804 botanical illustration of the species under the name H. elatum

The first mention of this hybrid in botanical literature was in Joseph Tournefort's 1700 work Institutiones rei herbariae. However, authorship of the species is given to Philip Miller, who included it in the 1768 edition of The Gardeners Dictionary. Both authors gave the following Latin polynomial to the plant, and Miller supplied an English translation:

Hypericum Orientale, foetido simile, sed inodorum.
Eastern St John's wort, like the stinking Kind, (Note: Hypericum hircinum is known as stinking tutsan.) but without Smell.

Furthermore, Miller designated a holotype for the plant: a cultivated specimen taken from the Chelsea Physic Garden in London.

In 1789, William Aiton described the same plant in Hortus Kewensis under a different name: Hypericum elatum. He offered a longer description, with details on the flowers of the plant, and called it the "tall St John's wort". The name H. elatum was popularly used for the species throughout the 19th century, and it was included in a partial monograph of Hypericum in 1821.

Beyond these two names, the plant was misidentified in various ways by more than half a dozen botanists in the 19th and 20th centuries. It was described as both of its parents, H. androsaemum and H. grandifolium. Some English specimens were called Hypericum anglicum on several occasions, and the names H. multiflorum and H. persistens have also been used. At some points, the plant was included in the genus Androsaemum (now the section in Hypericum to which it belongs) as A. pyramidale, A. parviflorum, and A. × urberuagae.

Norman Robson included the species in his assay of the genus Hypericum in Flora Europaea in 1968, confirming that it was an intermediate form of H. androsaemum and H. grandifolium and hypothesizing that it was a hybrid between the two species. This was confirmed in the 1985 installment of Robson's monograph of the genus, along with a detailed description of the species and a history of its nomenclature.

== Description ==
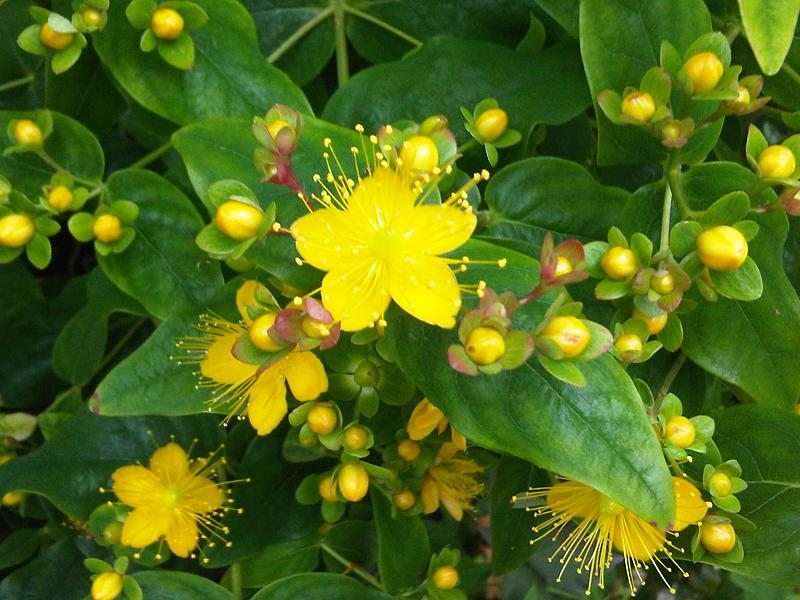
A flower cluster and leaves of Hypericum × inodorum from London

Hypericum × inodorum is a bushy perennial shrub that grows 0.6–2.0 meters (2 ft 0 in – 6 ft 7 in) tall and has a spread of 0.9–1.5 m (2 ft 11 in – 4 ft 11 in). Its branches stand upright and many originate at the base, which does not root aboveground.

The species' stems are cylindrical when the plant is mature. There is 0.2–0.8 centimeters of stem between pairs of leaves. The bark of the plant is scaly in texture. The leaves are directly attached to the stems, and do not have a leafstalk. Sometimes, the leaves even surround the stem somewhat. The leaf blades are 3.5–11 cm (1.4–4.3 in) long by 2.0–6.0 cm (0.8–2.4 in) wide, and are between an oval-lance shape and a wide egg shape, with a rounded or almost pointed tip. There are four or five pairs of main veins that arise from the midrib and ascend outwards in the direction of the tip of the leaf. The web of small tertiary veins is visible from either side of the leaf. There are small glands on the leaf, which are dense along its edges.

Every cluster of flowers usually has 3–23 flowers, which arise from one or two distinct nodes. There are no lower accessory flowers, and the bracts are small and lance-shaped. Each flower is 1.5–3.0 cm (0.6–1.2 in) wide, and before blooming have globe-shaped buds. The sepal leaves overlap each other and vary in size. They measure 0.5–1.0 cm long and 0.2–0.5 cm wide, and remain on the flower until the fruit ripens, or longer. The petals are golden yellow, without any red tinge. They can either spread out or curve inwards, and they measure 0.8–1.5 cm long. Every bundle of stamens has 20–30 stamens, the longest of which are 1.0–2.0 cm long. The seed capsule has thin walls and is flesh, and goes from a red to dark brown color, sometimes splitting at its end. The seeds inside are red-brown and are 0.12–0.15 cm long. They have a wing on one side, and sometimes have wing-like appendages on their end.

== Distribution, habitat, and ecology ==
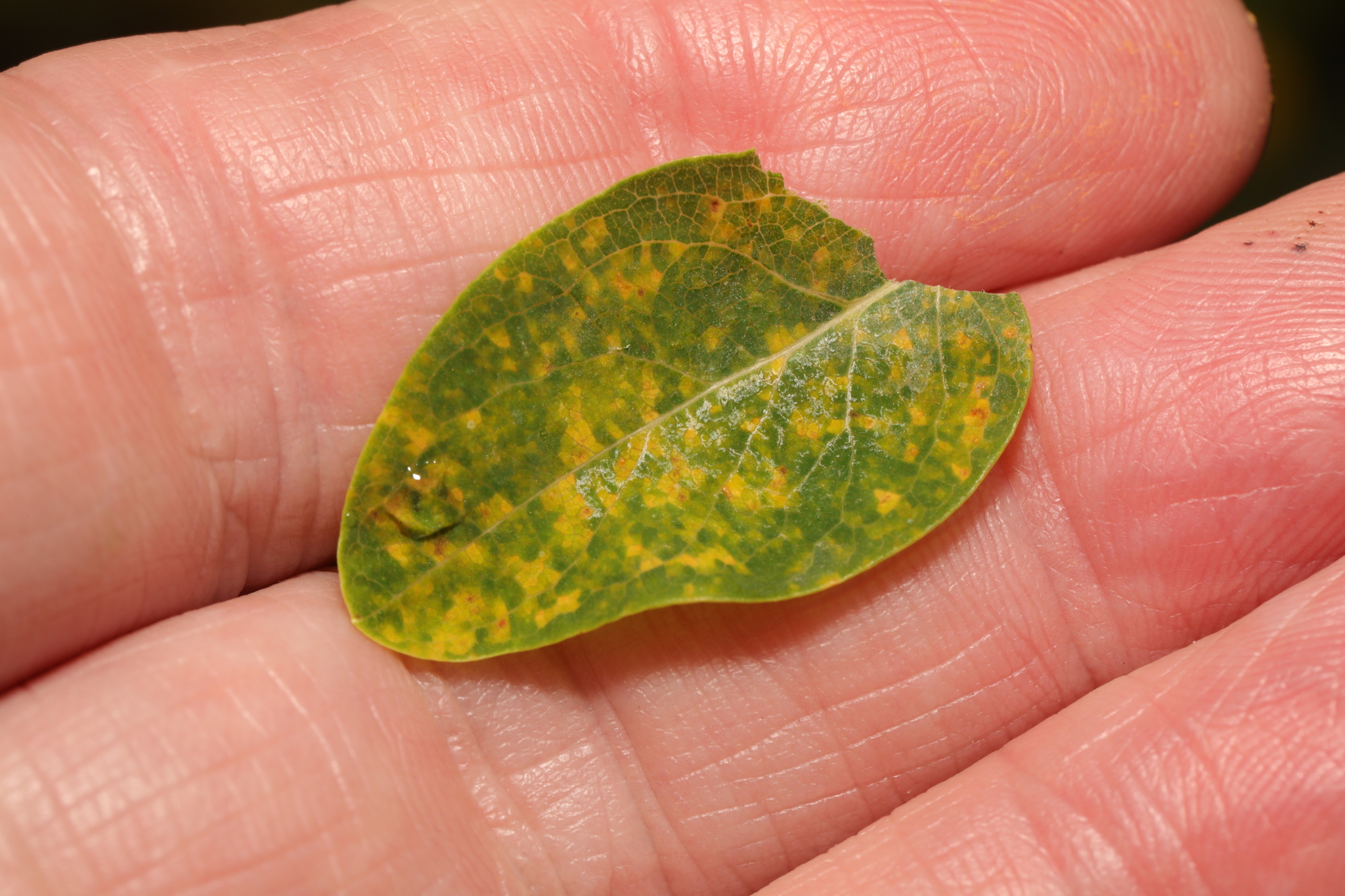
The rust fungus Melampsora hypericorum on a leaf of H. × inodorum

Hypericum × inodorum is native to France, Italy, and Spain. It has been introduced to the United Kingdom, Ireland, Chile, Java, Madeira, Mexico, New Zealand, Portugal, and Switzerland. The origin of Hypericum × inodorum has been misunderstood in several ways. William Aiton claimed it came from North America in 1789, and it took until 1886 for its status as an Old World species to be determined. In the 20th century, several botanists misidentified specimens of the hybrid for H. grandifolium, thus believing it originated in Macaronesia. According to Robson, the plant's habitat is in lowlands "in damp or shaded places".

Melampsora hypericorum is a rust fungus known as tutsan rust. It parasitizes several related species of Hypericum, including H. × inodorum. The pestaloid fungus Seimatosporium hypericinum has also been found infesting the plant in Brazil. In cultivated forms of the hybrid, insect herbivory and diseases are not major threats to the plant.

== Cultivation ==
Hypericum × inodorum is widely cultivated as an ornamental plant. It is hardy and capable of tolerating a variety of sun and soil conditions, including a pH range of at least 6.0–8.0. It is resistant to both drought and heavy shade.

In many publications, the 'Elstead' variety is the most prominently or only cultivar mentioned. The cultivar has small flowers that are 2.5–3.0 cm (1.0–1.2 in) wide with styles 0.6 cm long. The berries are 1.6–1.7 cm long by 0.8 cm wide and go from white to a bright pinkish-red as the plant matures. Because plants flower over about two months, many different stages of berry color can be seen at the same time.

Another notable cultivar is the 'Wilhyp' or 'Golden Beacon' variety. Hypericum × inodorum 'Golden Beacon' is a plant with gold foliage, prominent stamens, pink stems, and superior disease resistance. It has received the Royal Horticultural Society's Award of Garden Merit because of these attributes. Other less prominent cultivars include 'Summergold' (which has golden leaves), 'Red Star' (with red-tinted stems and foliage), 'Magical White' (with white berries), and 'Magical Universe' (resistant to rust fungus).

Selected Cultivars
Image	Name	Origin	Characteristics
	'Elstead'	Royal Botanic Gardens, Kew	White berries that become bright red and small star-shaped flowers.
	'Wilhyp' ('Golden Beacon')	Wales	Gold-colored foliage, pink stems, and disease resistance.
	'Kolmpass' ('Magical Passion')		
	'Kolmahwi' ('Magical White')		Red stems with prominent white berries.
