= C38H38O16 =

The molecular formula C_{38}H_{38}O_{16} (molar mass: 750.70 g/mol, exact mass: 750.2160 u) may refer to:

- Dicerandrol C
- Phomoxanthone A (PXA)
- Phomoxanthone B (PXB)
