= Benzoyl-CoA =

Benzoyl-Coenzyme A
- Chemical structure of benzoyl-CoA

Names
- Other names benzoyl-S-CoA; S-Benzoate coenzyme A

Identifiers
CAS Number	102185-37-5
3D model (JSmol)	Interactive image
ChEBI	CHEBI:15515
ChemSpider	7822142
PubChem CID	25245721
UNII	6ZL6G9S5GY
CompTox Dashboard (EPA)	DTXSID80585082
- InChI: InChI=1S/C28H40N7O17P3S/c1-28(2,22(38)25(39)31-9-8-18(36)30-10-11-56-27(40)16-6-4-3-5-7-16)13-49-55(46,47)52-54(44,45)48-12-17-21(51-53(41,42)43)20(37)26(50-17)35-15-34-19-23(29)32-14-33-24(19)35/h3-7,14-15,17,20-22,26,37-38H,8-13H2,1-2H3,(H,30,36)(H,31,39)(H,44,45)(H,46,47)(H2,29,32,33)(H2,41,42,43)/t17-,20-,21-,22+,26-/m1/s1 Key: VEVJTUNLALKRNO-TYHXJLICSA-N; InChI=1/C28H40N7O17P3S/c1-28(2,22(38)25(39)31-9-8-18(36)30-10-11-56-27(40)16-6-4-3-5-7-16)13-49-55(46,47)52-54(44,45)48-12-17-21(51-53(41,42)43)20(37)26(50-17)35-15-34-19-23(29)32-14-33-24(19)35/h3-7,14-15,17,20-22,26,37-38H,8-13H2,1-2H3,(H,30,36)(H,31,39)(H,44,45)(H,46,47)(H2,29,32,33)(H2,41,42,43)/t17-,20-,21-,22+,26-/m1/s1 Key: VEVJTUNLALKRNO-TYHXJLICBE
- SMILES: CC(C)(COP(=O)(O)OP(=O)(O)OC[C@@H]1[C@H]([C@H]([C@@H](O1)N2C=NC3=C(N=CN=C32)N)O)OP(=O)(O)O)[C@H](C(=O)NCCC(=O)NCCSC(=O)C4=CC=CC=C4)O

Properties
Chemical formula	C_{28}H_{36}N_{7}O_{17}P_{3}S^{−4}
Molar mass	867.60 g/mol
- Except where otherwise noted, data are given for materials in their standard state (at 25 °C [77 °F], 100 kPa). verify (what is ?) Infobox references

Benzoyl-CoA is the thioester derived from benzoic acid and coenzyme A. The term benzoyl-CoA also include diverse conjugates of coenzyme A and aromatic carboxylic acids. Benzoate, vanillin, anthranilic acid, 4-ethylphenol, p-cresol, phenol, aniline, terephthalic acid, [3-hydroxybenzoic acid, and phenylalanine are all metabolized to benzoyl-CoA. Additionally, cinnamic acid, p-coumaric acid, ferulic acid, toluene, caffeic acid, benzyl alcohol, and mandelic acid are suspected to be processed similarly.

== As substrate for reductases ==
Benzoyl CoA is processed anaerobically to the cyclohexadiene derivative.

Benzoyl-CoA is a substrate for diverse reductases: 4-hydroxybenzoyl-CoA reductase, benzoyl-CoA reductase, benzoyl-CoA 3-monooxygenase, benzoate-CoA ligase, 2alpha-hydroxytaxane 2-O-benzoyltransferase, anthranilate N-benzoyltransferase, biphenyl synthase, glycine N-benzoyltransferase, ornithine N-benzoyltransferase and phenylglyoxylate dehydrogenase (acylating). Benzoyl-CoA reductase converts benzoyl-CoA to cyclohex-1,5-diene-1-carbonyl-CoA, which is susceptible to hydrolysis, eventually giving acetyl coenzyme A. In this way, many aromatic compounds are biodegraded.

== As a benzoyl donor ==
Benzoyl-CoA is a benzoyl transfer agent for the biosynthesis of hippuric acid. Benzoyl-CoA is a substrate in the formation of xanthonoids in Hypericum androsaemum by benzophenone synthase, condensing a molecule of benzoyl-CoA with three malonyl-CoA, yielding to 2,4,6-trihydroxybenzophenone. This intermediate is subsequently converted by a benzophenone 3′-hydroxylase, a cytochrome P450 monooxygenase, leading to the formation of 2,3′,4,6-tetrahydroxybenzophenone.

Benzoyl-CoA is a substrate of benzoyl-CoA reductase. This enzyme is responsible in part for the reductive dearomatization of aryl compounds mediated by bacteria under anaerobic conditions.
