= Gamboge =

Yellow gum resin pigment from Cambodia

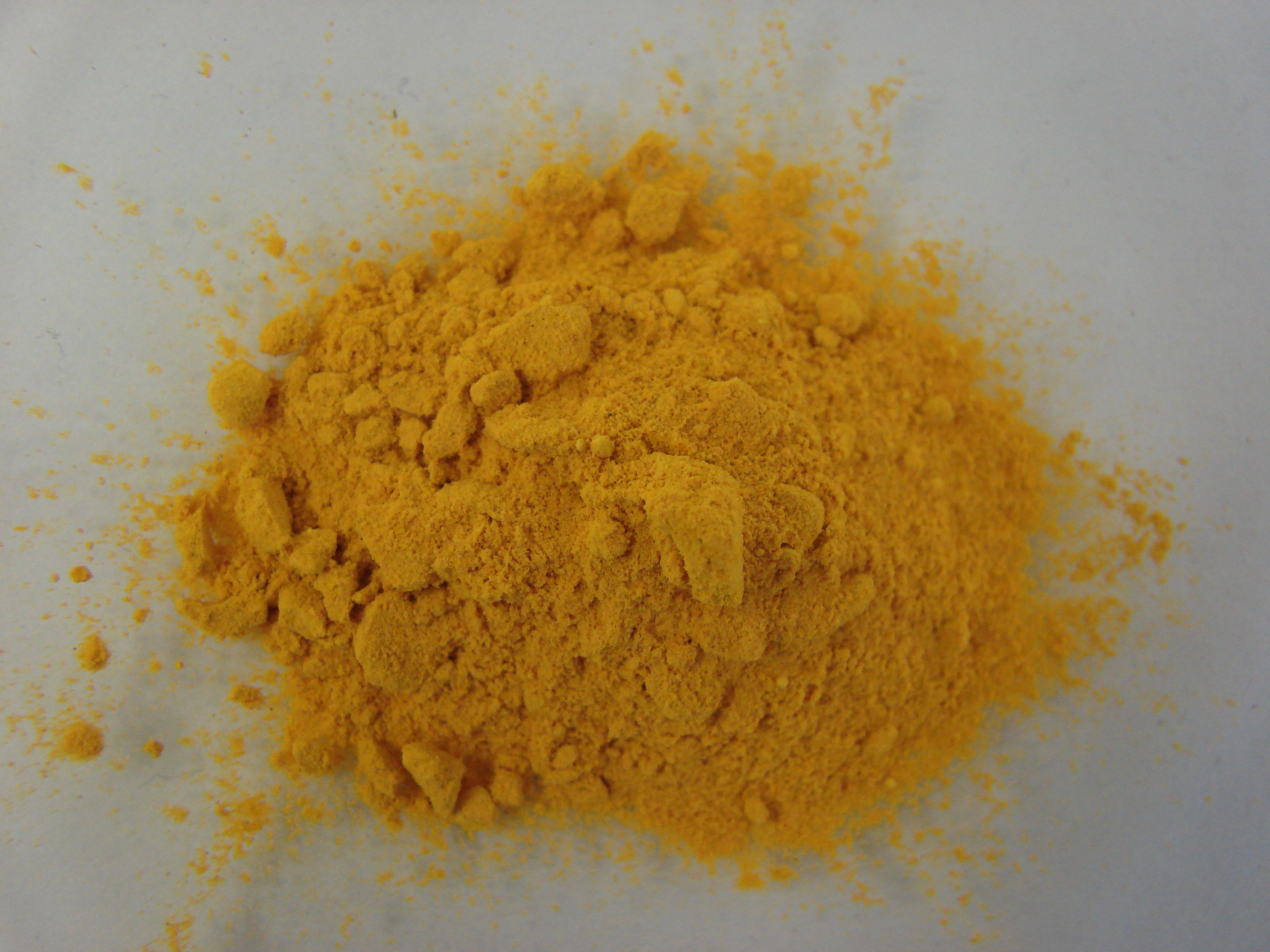

Color coordinates
- Hex triplet: #E49B0F
- sRGB^{B} (r, g, b): (228, 155, 15)
- HSV (h, s, v): (39°, 93%, 89%)
- CIELCh_{uv} (L, C, h): (69, 92, 48°)
- Source: Maerz and Paul (Note: The colour displayed in the colour box above matches the colour called gamboge in the 1930 book by Maerz and Paul (1930) A Dictionary of Color New York: McGraw-Hill; the colour gamboge is displayed on page 43, Plate 10, Color Sample K6.)
- ISCC–NBS descriptor: Strong orange yellow
- B: Normalized to [0–255] (byte)

Gamboge (/ɡæmˈboʊʒ, -ˈbuːʒ/ gam-BOHZH, -BOOZH) is a deep-yellow pigment derived from a species of tree that primarily grows in Cambodia. Popular in East Asian watercolor works, it has been used across a number of media dating back to the 8th century. Easy to transport and manipulate into a durable watercolor paint, gamboge is a versatile pigment that has been used in paintings, printing of books, and garment dyes, including the robes of Buddhist monks. Gamboge is toxic to humans, and is potentially deadly in large doses. Due to its toxicity and poor lightfastness, gamboge is no longer used in paints, though limited use continues in other contexts. However, gamboge does not react well with lime surfaces, making it unsuitable for frescos and with white lead. Despite its popularity, gamboge usage has not been extensively examined in works of art from any time period. The few instances where art historians have checked for the pigment in a given work have confirmed its widespread use and its longevity as staple in watercolor painting particularly in eastern art.

== History ==
Gamboge's first recorded use dates back to the 8th century during which time it appeared in Japanese art. Some historians speculate small shipments of the pigment were able to be distributed in European contexts due to the occasional over-land trade journeys made from Asia to Europe. Gamboge became much more accessible in the 17th century as shipping grew in popularity as a method of transporting goods from Asia to Europe, and it was around this time that its popularity in watercolors grew.

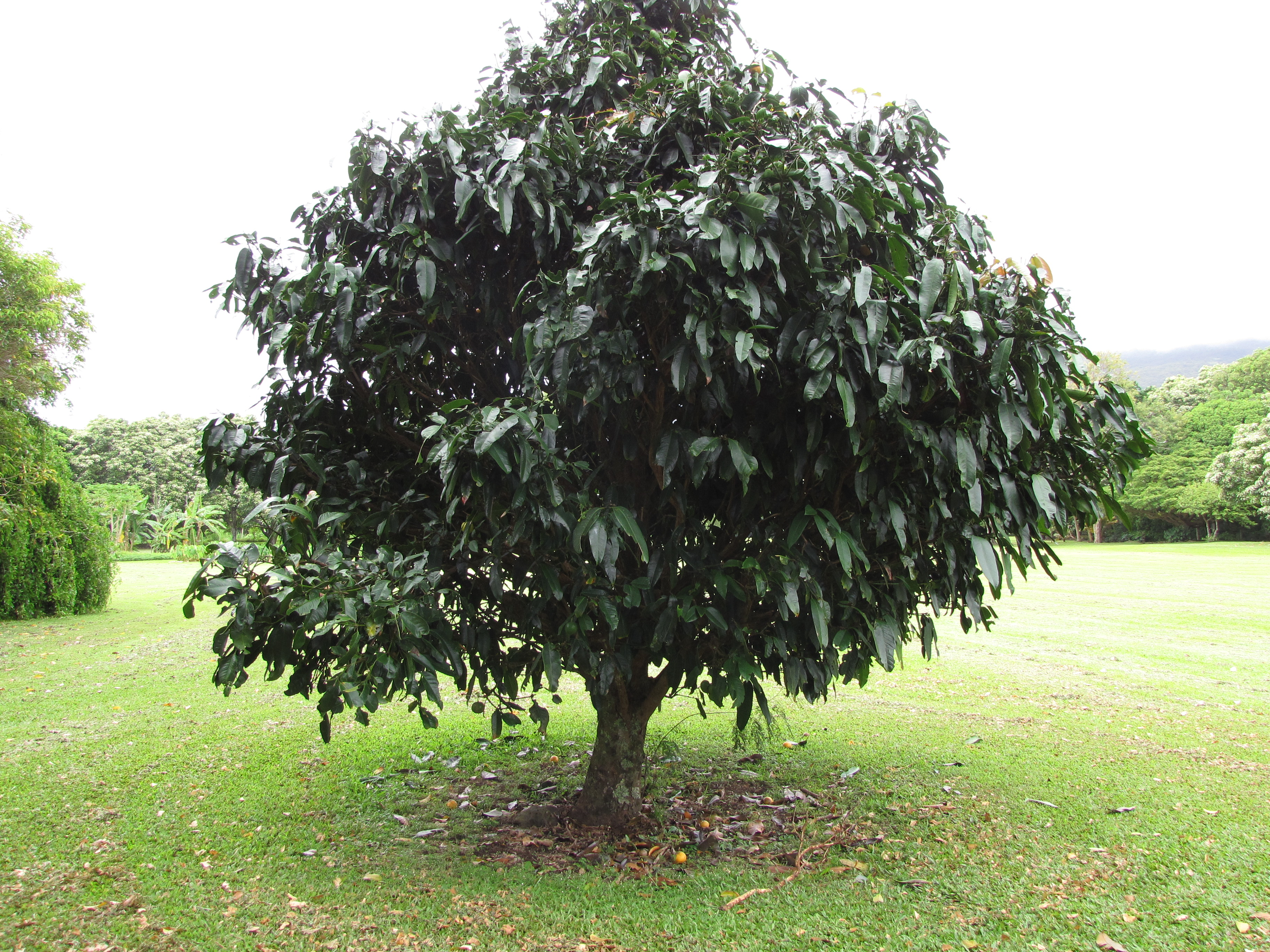
A Garcinia tree of the Clusiaceae family, which is the source of gamboge.

The pigment is derived from the gum of a species of evergreen of the family Guttiferae which grows in southeast Asia, primarily Cambodia and Thailand. In fact, gamboge gets its name from a now-antiquated name for Cambodia, Camboja, though it was also referred to as gama gitta in some 17th century European color manuals. The pigment is extracted from Guttiferae trees through a process of cutting several deep incisions into the tree's trunk thus allowing the resin to bleed out into pre-mounted bamboo canes used as receptacle to initially catch and later transport the product. The practice of collecting gamboge in bamboo cane was so widespread and recognizable that the pigment was often referred to as "pipe gamboge" for how it conformed to the cylindrical shape of the receptacle.

There was a brief shortage of the pigment during the 1970s and 1980s due to trade restrictions placed on the Khmer Rouge regime. During this time, shipments of the gum which makes gamboge were found to contain bullet casings and other impurities which tainted the pigment.

While gamboge is best known for its use in artwork, it does have a secondary function as a laxative. In small doses it can cause watery feces while large doses have been reported to cause death.In the 19th century, gamboge was the chief ingredient of "Morison's Pills", a widely sold quack remedy; several people in Britain died after taking large doses, and in 1836 one seller was convicted of manslaughter.

== Production ==
Gamboge is most often extracted by tapping latex (sometimes incorrectly referred to as sap) from various species of evergreen trees of the family Clusiaceae (also known as Guttiferae). The tree most commonly used is the gamboge tree (genus Garcinia), including G. hanburyi (Cambodia and Thailand), G. morella (India and Sri Lanka), and G. elliptica and G. heterandra (Myanmar). The orange fruit of Garcinia gummi-gutta (formerly called G. cambogia) is also known as gamboge or gambooge.

The trees must be at least ten years old before they are tapped. The resin is extracted by making spiral incisions in the bark, and by breaking off leaves and shoots and letting the milky yellow resinous gum drip out. The resulting latex is collected in hollow bamboo canes. After the resin is congealed, the bamboo is broken away and large rods of raw gamboge remain.

== Visual characteristics ==
After being extracted from the tree, gamboge resin has a brownish-yellow color; its deep yellow color appears after grinding. Artists sometimes combined Prussian blue with gamboge to create green; they also mixed it with burnt sienna to make orange.

Gamboge was most commonly used in watercolor painting.

== Permanence ==
Gamboge is highly sensitive to light. It is known to react poorly with lime surfaces and, as such, is deemed unsuitable for frescos. Gamboge is also known to react with white lead.

== Notable occurrences ==
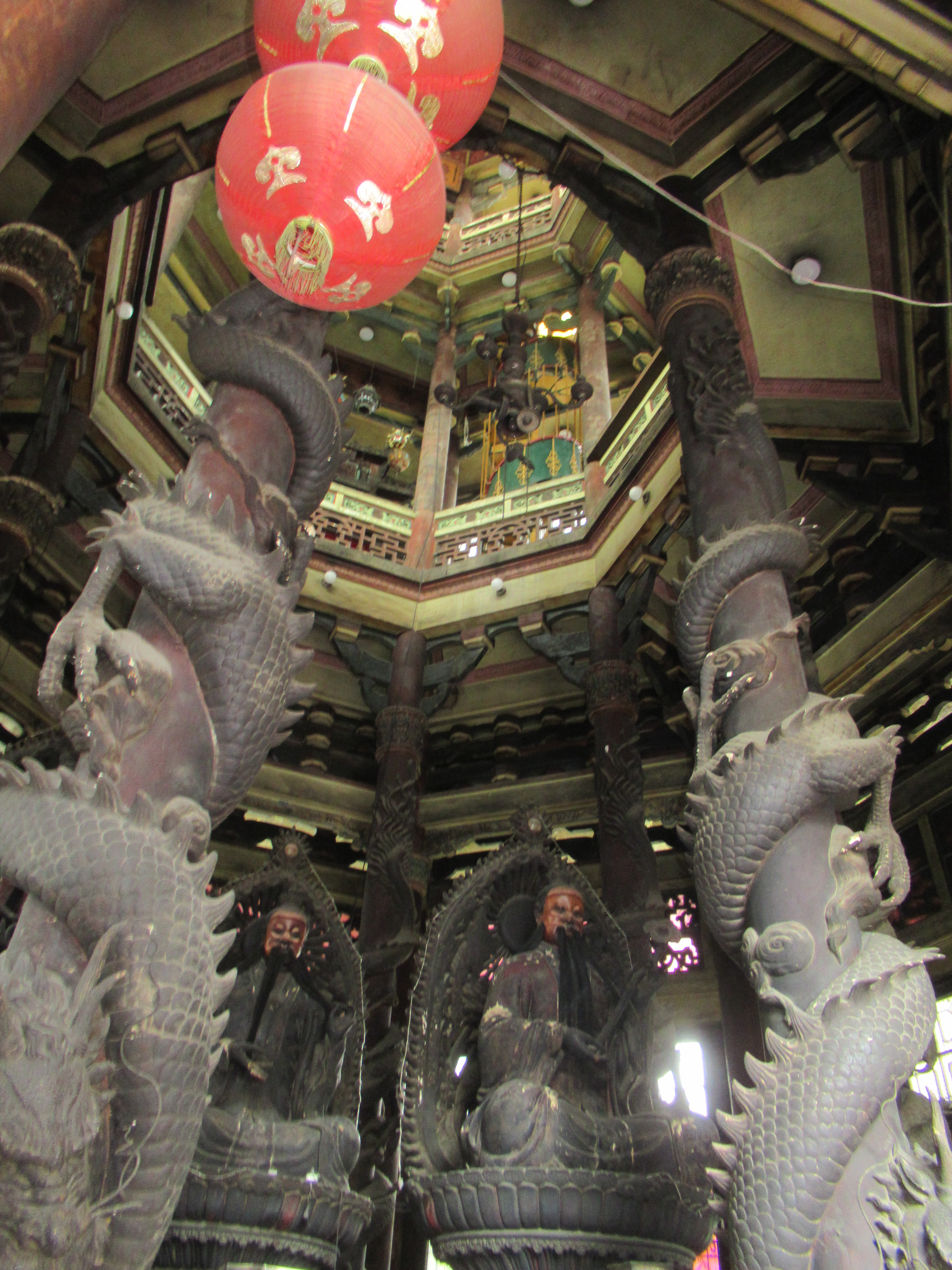
Maitepnimit Temple

Gamboge has not been extensively identified in works of art from any time period; many analyses of paintings simply identify the presence of "organic yellow" without distinguishing between different organic yellow pigments.

Gamboge has been identified as the underlying gold paint in the Maitepnimit Temple in Thailand as well as having featured in the Medieval Armenian Glajor Gospel. Though not authenticated, it has also been noted that Rembrandt may have used the pigment in a few of his works and that it appears in J. M. W. Turner's color box.
