= Benzoyl-CoA:anthranilate N-benzoyltransferase =

Benzoyl-CoA:anthranilate N-benzoyltransferase may refer to:

- N-benzoyl-4-hydroxyanthranilate 4-O-methyltransferase
- Anthranilate N-benzoyltransferase
