= PXA =

PXA may refer to:

- Pecotox Air, a Moldovan airline
- Phomoxanthone A, a mycotoxin that affects the mitochondria
- Pleomorphic xanthoastrocytoma, a type of brain tumour
- PXA, a processor family based on the XScale microarchitecture
- Atung Bungsu Airport IATA code
