= Ornithine N-benzoyltransferase =

Enzyme

Identifiers
- EC no.: 2.3.1.127
- CAS no.: 111693-97-1

Databases
- IntEnz: IntEnz view
- BRENDA: BRENDA entry
- ExPASy: NiceZyme view
- KEGG: KEGG entry
- MetaCyc: metabolic pathway
- PRIAM: profile
- PDB structures: RCSB PDB PDBe PDBsum
- Gene Ontology: AmiGO / QuickGO
Search
- PMC: articles
- PubMed: articles
- NCBI: proteins

Ornithine N-benzoyltransferase (EC 2.3.1.127) is an enzyme that catalyzes the chemical reaction

ornithine
+ 2
benzoyl-CoA
N(2),N(5)-dibenzoyl-L-ornithine
+ 2 coenzyme A

The substrates of this enzyme characterised from quail liver are ornithine and two units of benzoyl-CoA. Its products are N(2),N(5)-dibenzoyl-L-ornithine (ornithuric acid) and two units of coenzyme A.

The enzyme belongs to the family of transferases, specifically those acyltransferases transferring groups other than aminoacyl groups. The systematic name of this enzyme class is benzoyl-CoA:L-ornithine N-benzoyltransferase. It is also called ornithine N-acyltransferase.
