= Phenylglyoxylate dehydrogenase (acylating) =

phenylglyoxylate dehydrogenase (acylating)

Identifiers
- EC no.: 1.2.1.58
- CAS no.: 205510-78-7

Databases
- BRENDA: enzyme data
- ExPASy: NiceZyme view
- KEGG: enzyme entry
- MetaCyc: metabolic pathway
- Rhea: reactions
- PDB structures: RCSB PDB PDBe PDBsum
- Gene Ontology: AmiGO / QuickGO
Search
- PMC: articles
- PubMed: articles
- NCBI: proteins

In enzymology, phenylglyoxylate dehydrogenase (acylating; EC 1.2.1.58) is an enzyme that catalyzes the chemical reaction

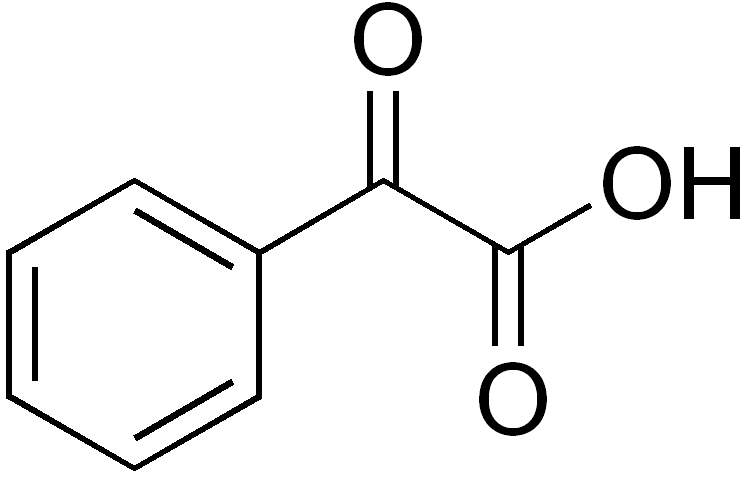
phenylglyoxylic acid
+ Coenzyme A + NAD^{+}
CO_{2} + H^{+}
CO_{2} + H^{+}
benzoyl-CoA
+ NADH

The three substrates of this enzyme are phenylglyoxylic aicd, coenzyme A, and oxidised nicotinamide adenine dinucleotide (NAD^{+}). Its products are benzoyl-CoA, carbon dioxide, reduced NADH, and a proton.

This enzyme belongs to the family of oxidoreductases, specifically those acting on the aldehyde or oxo group of donor with NAD+ or NADP+ as acceptor. The systematic name of this enzyme class is phenylglyoxylate:NAD+ oxidoreductase. It has 3 cofactors: FAD, Thiamin diphosphate, and Iron-sulfur.
