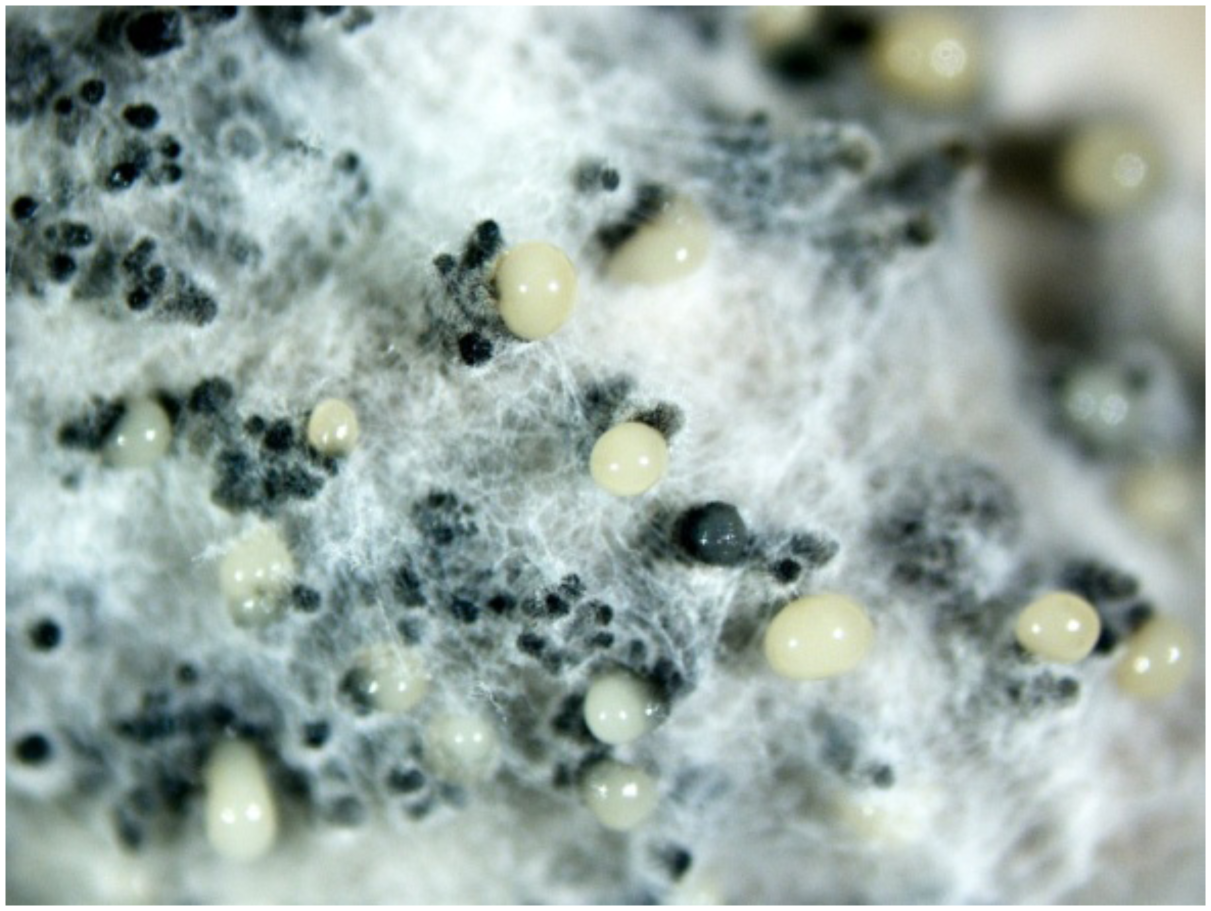
- Phomopsis longicolla pycnidia on soybean seed

Scientific classification
- Kingdom: Fungi
- Division: Ascomycota
- Class: Sordariomycetes
- Order: Diaporthales
- Family: Valsaceae
- Genus: Phomopsis
- Species: P. longicolla

Binomial name
- Phomopsis longicolla Thomas W. Hobbs, 1985

= Phomopsis longicolla =

Species of fungus

Phomopsis longicolla is a species of ascomycete fungus in the family Diaporthaceae. It is a plant pathogen and mainly responsible for a soybean disease called Phomopsis seed decay (PSD). In other plant species, P. longicolla can also live as an endophyte, such as in the mangrove plant Sonneratia caseolaris. P. longicolla has been found to produce a number of cytotoxic and antimicrobial secondary metabolites, especially members of the class of phomoxanthones. P. longicolla was first described in 1985 by Thomas W. Hobbs et al. at the Department of Plant Pathology at Ohio State University.
