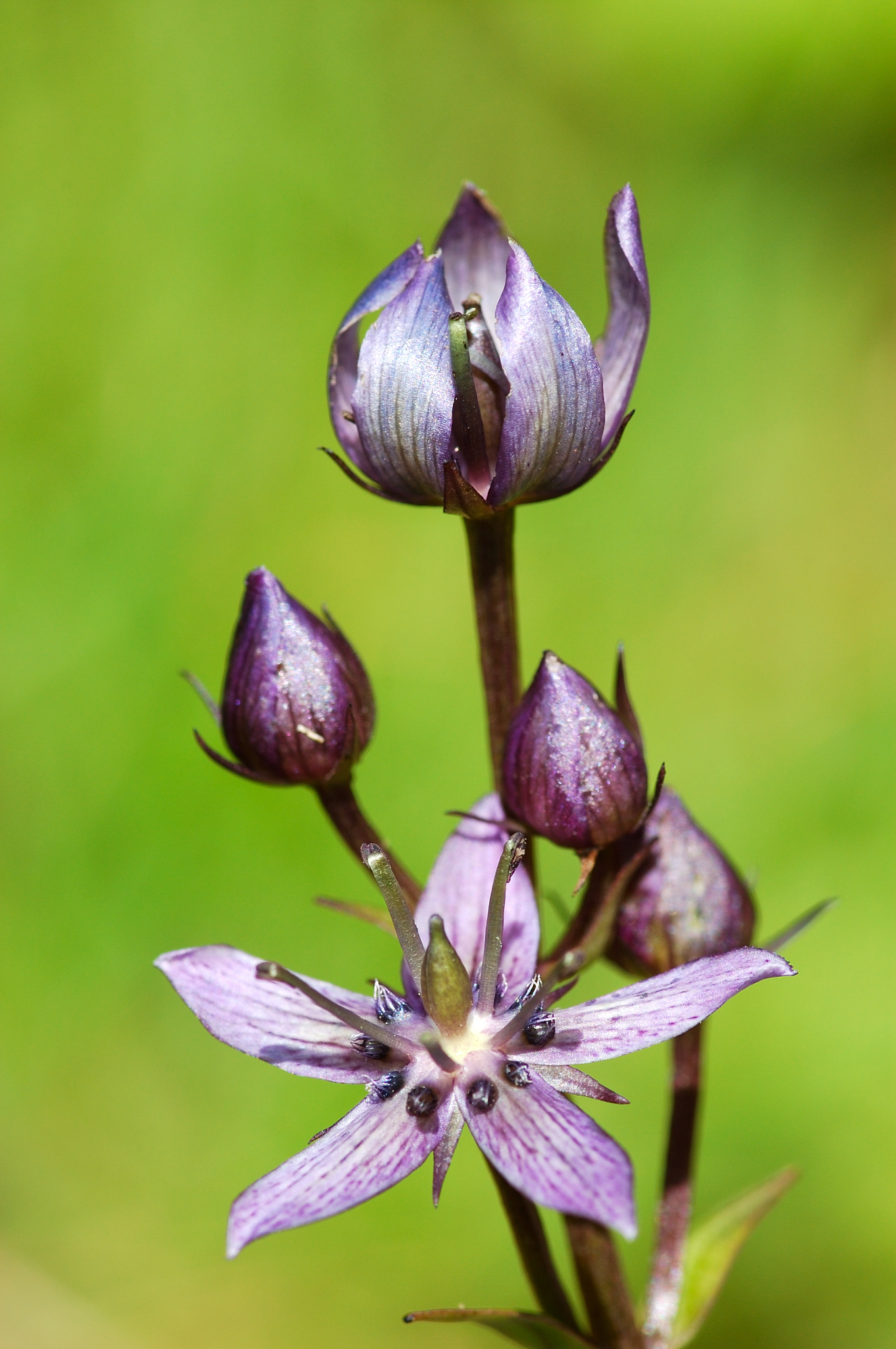

Conservation status
- Secure (NatureServe)

Scientific classification
- Kingdom: Plantae
- Clade: Tracheophytes
- Clade: Angiosperms
- Clade: Eudicots
- Clade: Asterids
- Order: Gentianales
- Family: Gentianaceae
- Genus: Swertia
- Species: S. perennis

Binomial name
- Swertia perennis L.

Varieties
- Swertia perennis var. cuspidata Maxim.; Swertia perennis var. perennis

Synonyms
- List: Blepharaden perennis (L.) Dulac (1867); Gentiana swertia E.H.L.Krause (1903)

= Swertia perennis =

Plant species in the gentian family

Swertia perennis is a species of flowering plant in the gentian family known by the common names felwort and star swertia. It is native to several regions of the northern hemisphere, including much of Eurasia and western North America. It is a plant of wetlands, particularly calcareous fens. It is common to abundant in many areas, but it is known to be negatively impacted by habitat fragmentation and other habitat destruction, and human activity has led to its extirpation from some areas where it was once common. It is a perennial herb producing usually one erect stem growing 10 to 50 centimeters tall. The basal leaves are spoon-shaped with rounded tips, and leaves higher on the plant are widely lance-shaped or somewhat oval, with pointed tips. The inflorescence is an open panicle of flowers atop the stem. Each flower has a calyx of four or five pointed sepals and a corolla of four or five pointed lobes each up to 1.3 centimeters long. The corolla is dull blue to violet in color with darker purplish veining or stippling. There are two rounded nectary pits at the base of each lobe of the corolla. Stamens tipped with large anthers surround a central ovary.
