= Glycine N-benzoyltransferase =

Enzyme

Identifiers
- EC no.: 2.3.1.71
- CAS no.: 71567-07-2

Databases
- IntEnz: IntEnz view
- BRENDA: BRENDA entry
- ExPASy: NiceZyme view
- KEGG: KEGG entry
- MetaCyc: metabolic pathway
- PRIAM: profile
- PDB structures: RCSB PDB PDBe PDBsum
- Gene Ontology: AmiGO / QuickGO
Search
- PMC: articles
- PubMed: articles
- NCBI: proteins

Glycine N-benzoyltransferase (EC 2.3.1.71) is an enzyme that catalyzes the chemical reaction

glycine
+
benzoyl-CoA
hippuric acid
+ coenzyme A

Thus, the two substrates of this enzyme are glycine and benzoyl-CoA. Its products are hippuric acid and coenzyme A.

This enzyme belongs to the family of transferases, specifically those acyltransferases transferring groups other than aminoacyl groups. The systematic name of this enzyme class is benzoyl-CoA:glycine N-benzoyltransferase. Other names in common use include benzoyl CoA-amino acid N-acyltransferase, and benzoyl-CoA:glycine N-acyltransferase.

== See also ==
- Glycine N-acyltransferase, which can catalyse the same reaction
