= Benzoyl-CoA 3-monooxygenase =

Class of enzymes

benzoyl-CoA 3-monooxygenase

Identifiers
- EC no.: 1.14.13.58
- CAS no.: 151616-61-4

Databases
- IntEnz: IntEnz view
- BRENDA: BRENDA entry
- ExPASy: NiceZyme view
- KEGG: KEGG entry
- MetaCyc: metabolic pathway
- PRIAM: profile
- PDB structures: RCSB PDB PDBe PDBsum
- Gene Ontology: AmiGO / QuickGO
Search
- PMC: articles
- PubMed: articles
- NCBI: proteins

In enzymology, a benzoyl-CoA 3-monooxygenase (EC 1.14.13.58) is an enzyme that catalyzes the chemical reaction:

benzoyl-CoA + NADPH + H^{+} + O_{2} $\rightleftharpoons$ 3-hydroxybenzoyl-CoA + NADP^{+} + H_{2}O

The 4 substrates of this enzyme are benzoyl-CoA, NADPH, H^{+}, and O_{2}, whereas its 3 products are 3-hydroxybenzoyl-CoA, NADP^{+}, and H_{2}O.

This enzyme belongs to the family of oxidoreductases, specifically those acting on paired donors, with O2 as oxidant and incorporation or reduction of oxygen. The oxygen incorporated need not be derived from O2 with NADH or NADPH as one donor, and incorporation of one atom o oxygen into the other donor. The systematic name of this enzyme class is benzoyl-CoA,NADPH:oxygen oxidoreductase (3-hydroxylating). This enzyme is also called benzoyl-CoA 3-hydroxylase.

The enzyme is found in Pseudomonas bacteria.
