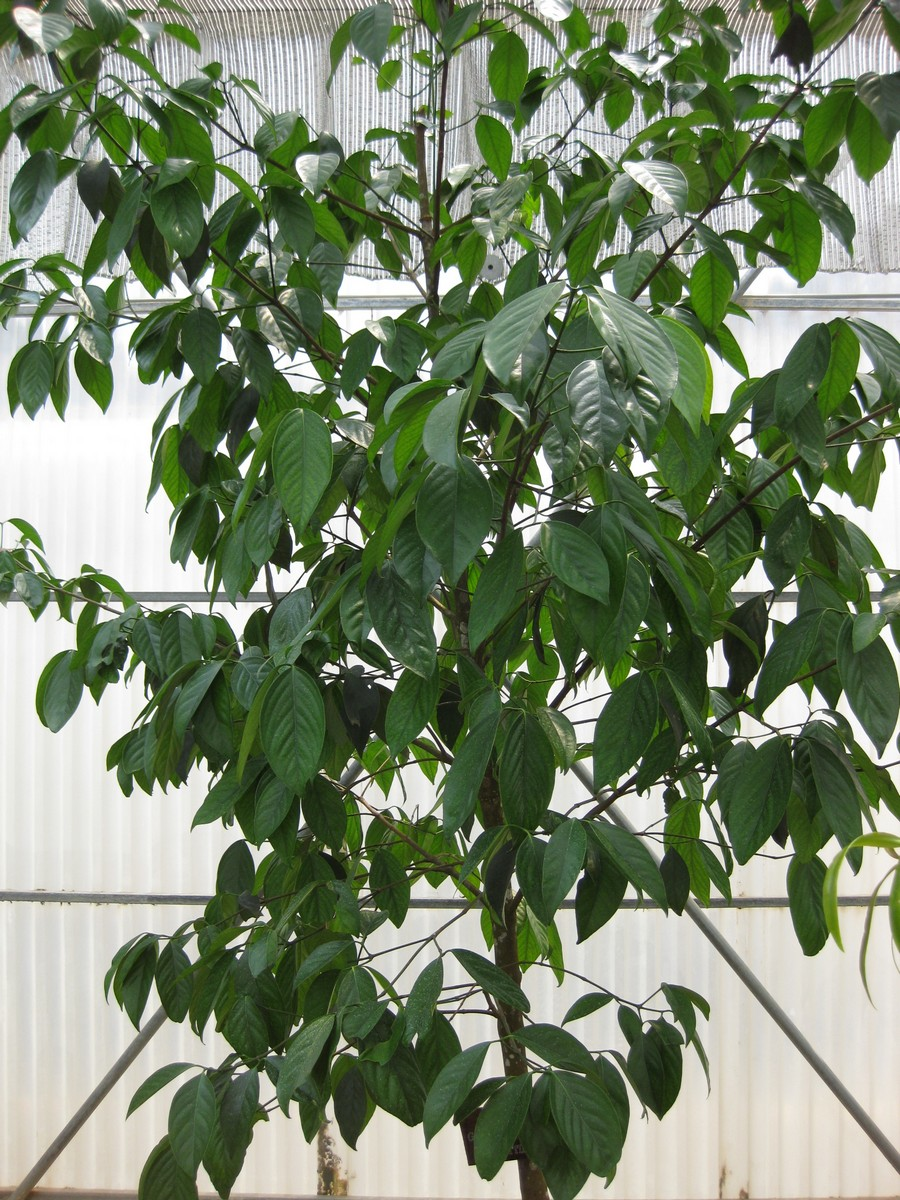

Scientific classification
- Kingdom: Plantae
- Clade: Tracheophytes
- Clade: Angiosperms
- Clade: Eudicots
- Clade: Rosids
- Order: Malpighiales
- Family: Clusiaceae
- Genus: Garcinia
- Species: G. hanburyi

Binomial name
- Garcinia hanburyi Hook.f., J. Linn. Soc., Bot. 14:485. 1875

= Garcinia hanburyi =

Species of flowering plant

Garcinia hanburyi is a plant species in the genus Garcinia, native to Indochina; it is one of the gamboge producing trees.

Cytotoxic xanthonoids (gambogin, morellin dimethyl acetal, isomoreollin B, moreollic acid, gambogenic acid, gambogenin, isogambogenin, desoxygambogenin, gambogenin dimethyl acetal, gambogellic acid, gambogic acid, isomorellin, morellic acid, desoxymorellin, hanburin) and isomorellinol can be isolated from the dry latex of G. hanburyi.
