= Phomoxanthone B =

Names
- Preferred IUPAC name (5R,5′R,6R,6′R,10aR,10′aR)-10a,10′a-Bis[(acetyloxy)methyl]-1,1′,8,8′-tetrahydroxy-6,6′-dimethyl-9,9′-dioxo-5,5′,6,6′,7,7′,10a,10′a-octahydro-9H,9′H-[2,4′-bixanthene]-5,5′-diyl diacetate
- Other names PXB

Identifiers
CAS Number	359844-70-5
3D model (JSmol)	Interactive image; Interactive image; Interactive image
ChEBI	CHEBI:66750
ChEMBL	ChEMBL511092
ChemSpider	10213923
PubChem CID	10033009
CompTox Dashboard (EPA)	DTXSID101336289
- InChI: InChI=1S/C38H38O16/c1-15-11-25(45)30-33(48)28-26(53-37(30,13-49-17(3)39)35(15)51-19(5)41)10-8-21(31(28)46)22-7-9-23(43)27-32(47)29-24(44)12-16(2)36(52-20(6)42)38(29,54-34(22)27)14-50-18(4)40/h7-10,15-16,35-36,43,46-48H,11-14H2,1-6H3/t15-,16-,35-,36-,37+,38+/m1/s1 Key: RWPGIQJRECCQEK-ACMZUNAXSA-N
- SMILES: CC1CC(=O)C2=C(C3=C(C=CC(=C3O)C4=C5C(=C(C=C4)O)C(=C6C(=O)CC(C(C6(O5)COC(=O)C)OC(=O)C)C)O)OC2(C1OC(=O)C)COC(=O)C)O; [C@H]1(CC(=C2[C@@]([C@@H]1OC(=O)C)(Oc1c(C2=O)c(ccc1c1c(c2C(=O)C3=C(C[C@H]([C@H]([C@]3(Oc2cc1)COC(=O)C)OC(=O)C)C)O)O)O)COC(=O)C)O)C; C[C@@H]1CC(=O)C2=C(C3=C(C=CC(=C3O)C4=C5C(=C(C=C4)O)C(=C6C(=O)C[C@H]([C@H]([C@]6(O5)COC(=O)C)OC(=O)C)C)O)O[C@@]2([C@@H]1OC(=O)C)COC(=O)C)O

Properties
Chemical formula	C_{38}H_{38}O_{16}
Molar mass	750.70 g/mol
Solubility in water	not soluble
Solubility in DMSO	good
Solubility in EtOH	moderate
- Except where otherwise noted, data are given for materials in their standard state (at 25 °C [77 °F], 100 kPa). Infobox references

The mycotoxin phomoxanthone B, or PXB for short, is a toxic natural product. It is a less toxic isomer of phomoxanthone A and one of the two founding members of the class of phomoxanthone compounds. The phomoxanthones are named after the fungus Phomopsis, from which they were first isolated, and after their xanthonoid structure. Chemically, they are dimers of two tetrahydroxanthones that are covalently linked to each other. PXB itself is a homodimer of two identical diacetylated tetrahydroxanthones. The position of the link between the two tetrahydroxanthones is the only structural difference between PXB and its isomers PXA and dicerandrol C: In PXA, the two xanthonoid monomers are symmetrically linked at C-4,4’, while in PXB, they are asymmetrically linked at C-2,4’, and in dicerandrol C, they are symmetrically linked at C-2,2’.
