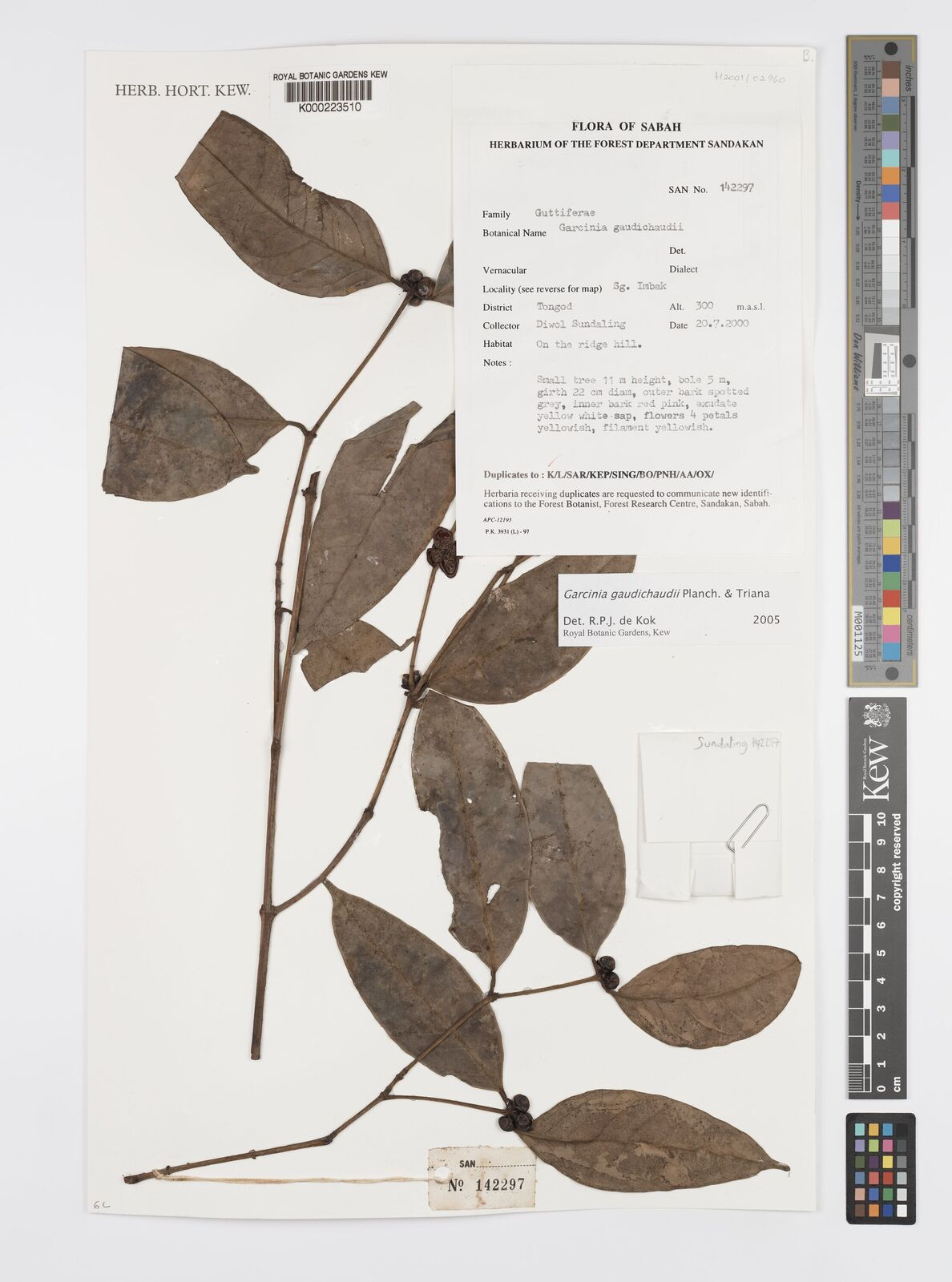
- Herbarium specimen

Conservation status
- Least Concern (IUCN 3.1)

Scientific classification
- Kingdom: Plantae
- Clade: Tracheophytes
- Clade: Angiosperms
- Clade: Eudicots
- Clade: Rosids
- Order: Malpighiales
- Family: Clusiaceae
- Genus: Garcinia
- Species: G. gaudichaudii

Binomial name
- Garcinia gaudichaudii Planch. & Triana

= Garcinia gaudichaudii =

Species of flowering plant

Garcinia gaudichaudii is a species of plant in the family Clusiaceae. It is native to Laos and Vietnam, where it grows in lowland tropical rain forest.

== Chemistry ==
The xanthonoids gaudichaudione A, B, C, D, E, F, G, H, gaudichaudiic acid A, B, C, D, E, morellic acid and forbesione from G. gaudichaudii.
