= Benzoyl-CoA reductase =

benzoyl-CoA reductase

Identifiers
- EC no.: 1.3.7.8
- CAS no.: 176591-18-7

Databases
- IntEnz: IntEnz view
- BRENDA: BRENDA entry
- ExPASy: NiceZyme view
- KEGG: KEGG entry
- MetaCyc: metabolic pathway
- PRIAM: profile
- PDB structures: RCSB PDB PDBe PDBsum
- Gene Ontology: AmiGO / QuickGO
Search
- PMC: articles
- PubMed: articles
- NCBI: proteins

In enzymology, a benzoyl-CoA reductase (EC 1.3.7.8) is an enzyme that catalyzes the chemical reaction

benzoyl-CoA + reduced acceptor + 2 ATP + 2 H_{2}O $\rightleftharpoons$ cyclohexa-1,5-diene-1-carbonyl-CoA + acceptor + 2 ADP + 2 phosphate

The 4 substrates of this enzyme are benzoyl-CoA, reduced acceptor, ATP, and H_{2}O, whereas its 4 products are cyclohexa-1,5-diene-1-carbonyl-CoA, acceptor, ADP, and phosphate.

This enzyme belongs to the family of oxidoreductases, specifically those acting on the CH-CH group of donor with other acceptors. The systematic name of this enzyme class is cyclohexa-1,5-diene-1-carbonyl-CoA:acceptor oxidoreductase (aromatizing, ATP-forming). This enzyme is also called benzoyl-CoA reductase (dearomatizing). This enzyme participates in benzoate degradation via CoA ligation. It has two cofactors: manganese, and magnesium.
