= Biphenyl synthase =

Identifiers
- EC no.: 2.3.1.177

Databases
- IntEnz: IntEnz view
- BRENDA: BRENDA entry
- ExPASy: NiceZyme view
- KEGG: KEGG entry
- MetaCyc: metabolic pathway
- PRIAM: profile
- PDB structures: RCSB PDB PDBe PDBsum
Search
- PMC: articles
- PubMed: articles
- NCBI: proteins

Biphenyl synthase (EC 2.3.1.177) is an enzyme that catalyzes a biosynthesis of the polyketide, 3,5-dihydroxybiphenyl, from one unit of benzoyl-CoA and three of malonyl-CoA. It was characterised from the tree species Sorbus aucuparia and is part of the pathway that yields aucuparin, a phytoalexin.

benzoyl-CoA
+ 3
malonyl-CoA
4 CO_{2}
3,5-dihydroxybiphenyl
+ 4
coenzyme A

This enzyme belongs to the family of transferases, specifically those acyltransferases transferring groups other than aminoacyl groups. The systematic name of this enzyme class is malonyl-CoA:benzoyl-CoA malonyltransferase. This enzyme is also called BIS.
