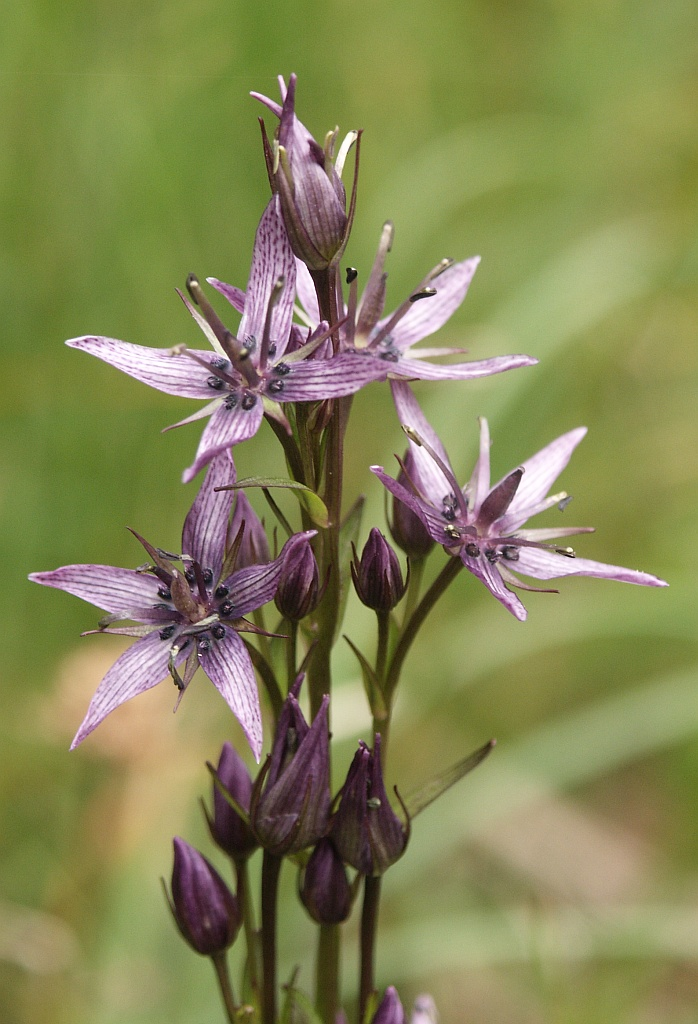
- Swertia perennis

Scientific classification
- Kingdom: Plantae
- Clade: Tracheophytes
- Clade: Angiosperms
- Clade: Eudicots
- Clade: Asterids
- Order: Gentianales
- Family: Gentianaceae
- Subtribe: Swertiinae
- Genus: Swertia; L.

Type species
- Swertia perennis L.

Species
- 120–150; see text

Synonyms
- Kingdon-Wardia C. Marquand; Ophelia D. Don; Pleurogyne Eschsch. ex Griseb.; Swertopsis Makino; Synallodia Raf.; Tesseranthium Kellogg; Probable synonyms: Anagallidium Griseb.; Possible synonyms: Frasera Walter; Lomatogoniopsis T. N. Ho & S. W. Liu

= Swertia =

Genus of plants

Swertia is a genus in the gentian family containing plants sometimes referred to as the felworts. Some species bear very showy purple and blue flowers. Many members of this genus have medicinal and cultural purposes.

Plants of genus Frasera are sometimes considered part of this genus, sometimes as a separate genus, and sometimes as synonymous.

== Selected species ==
According to Plants of the World Online, the genus has 165 species. Species in the genus Swertia include, but are not limited to:

- Swertia angustifolia Buch.-Ham. ex D. Don
- Swertia bimaculata (Siebold & Zucc.) C. B. Clarke
  - Swertia bimaculata (Siebold & Zucc.) Hook. f. & Thoms.
- Swertia calcicola Kerr.
- Swertia chinensis (Griseb.) Franch.
  - Swertia diluta (Turcz.) Benth. & Hook. f.
- Swertia chirayita (Roxb. ex Fleming) H. Karst.
  - Swertia chirata (Wall.) C. B. Clarke
- Swertia ciliata (D. Don ex G. Don) B. L. Burtt.
- Swertia cordata (Wall. ex G. Don) C.B. Clarke
- Swertia dilatata C. B. Clarke
- Swertia hookeri C. B. Clarke
- Swertia japonica (Roem. & Schult.) (Makino) (known by the common names Japanese felwort and Japanese star swertia.)
- Swertia leduci Franch.
  - Swertia mileensis T. N. Ho & W. L. Shih
- Swertia macrosperma C. B. Clarke
- Swertia multicaulis D. Don
- Swertia nervosa (G. Don) C. B. Clarke
- Swertia perennis L.
- Swertia pseudochinensis H.Hara
- Swertia punicea Hemsl.
- Swertia purpurascens (D. Don) A. Wall ex E. D. Clarke
- Swertia striata Collett & Hemsl.
- Swertia tashiroi (Maxim.) Makino
- Swertia tetrapetala Pall.
- Swertia tibetica Batal.
- Swertia tongluensis Burkill
- Swertia tozanensis Hayata
- Swertia trichotoma Wight ex C.B.Clarke
- Swertia uniflora Mildbr.
- Swertia usambarensis Engl.
- Swertia veratroides Maxim. ex Kom.
- Swertia verticillifolia T.N.Ho & S.W.Liu
- Swertia virescens Harry Sm.
- Swertia volkensii Gilg
- Swertia wardii C.Marquand
- Swertia wattii C.B.Clarke
- Swertia welwitschii Engl.
- Swertia wolfgangiana Grüning
- Swertia woodii J.Shah
- Swertia yezo-alpina H.Hara
- Swertia younghusbandii Burkill
- Swertia yunnanensis Burkill
- Swertia zayuensis T.N.Ho & S.W.Liu
- Swertia zeylanica (Griseb.) Walker ex C.B.Clarke

== Chemical constituents ==
Swertia contains the chemicals sawertiamarine, mangeferin and amarogenitine 1,5,8-trihydroxy-3-methoxyxanthone, 1-hydroxy-2,3,5,7-tetramethoxyxanthone, 1-hydroxy-3,5,8-trimethoxyxanthone, 1-hydroxyl-2,3,4,6-tetramethoxyxanthone, 1-hydroxy-2,3,4,7-tetramethoxyxanthone, 1,8-dihydroxy-3,5-dimethoxyxanthone, 1,7-dihydroxy-3,8-dimethoxyxanthone, 1,3,5,8-tetrahydroxyxanthone, balanophonin, oleanolic acid, maslinic acid, and sumaresinolic acid. Swerilactones from Swertia mileensis showed anti-hepatitis B virus activity in vitro.

== Traditional medicine ==
Swertia is used in Indian Ayurvedic Herbal System to cure Fever as in Laghu sudarshana churna, Maha sudarshan Churna and in Tibetan folk medicine. It is also one of the most widely used medicinal plants of Sikkim, and is considered Vulnerable based on IUCN CAMP Criteria.
