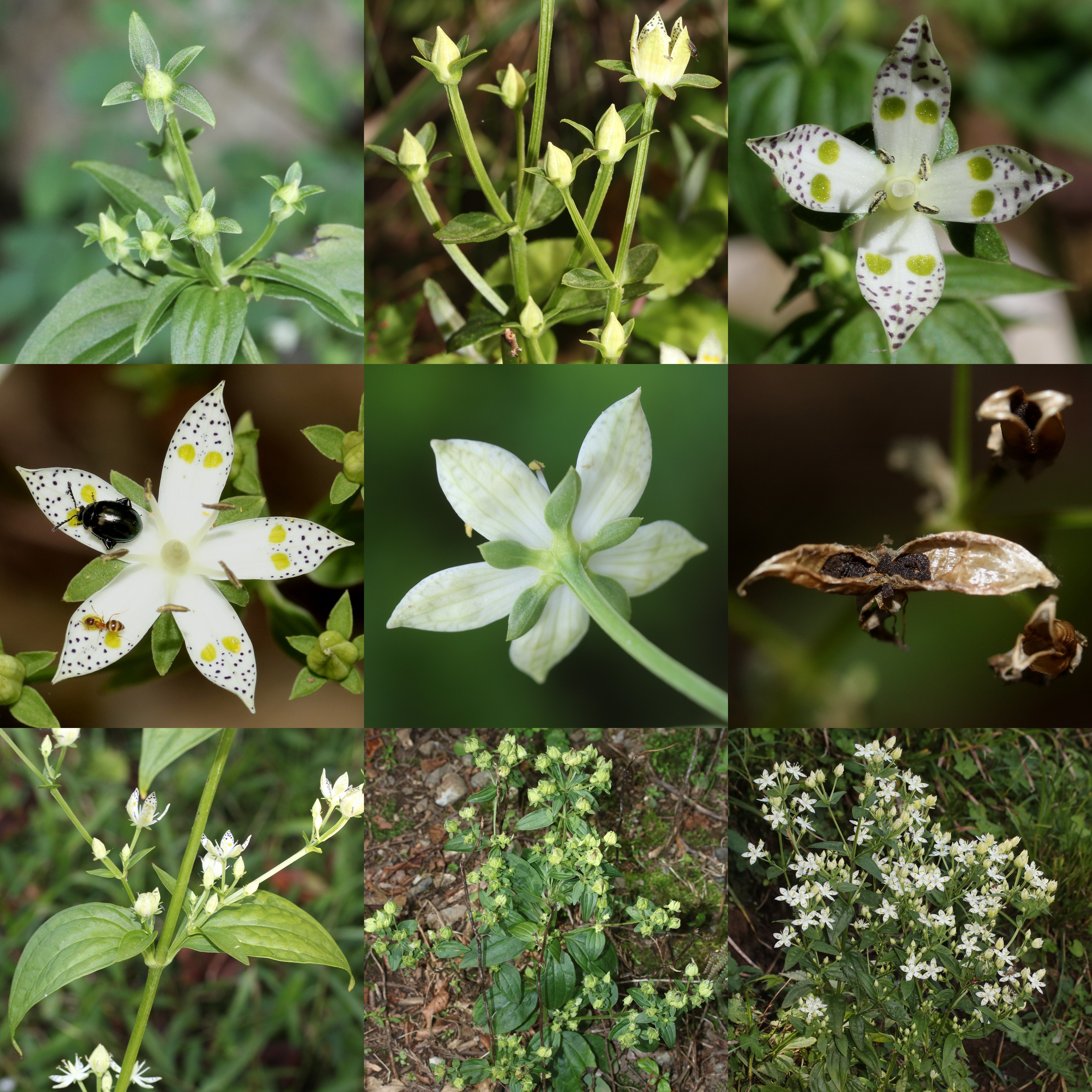

Scientific classification
- Kingdom: Plantae
- Clade: Tracheophytes
- Clade: Angiosperms
- Clade: Eudicots
- Clade: Asterids
- Order: Gentianales
- Family: Gentianaceae
- Genus: Swertia
- Species: S. bimaculata

Binomial name
- Swertia bimaculata (Siebold & Zucc.) Hook.f. & Thomson ex C.B.Clarke

Synonyms
- Ophelia bimaculata Siebold & Zucc. Swertia bimaculata var. macrocarpa Nakai; Silene esquirolii H.Lév. Swertia platyphylla Merr.

= Swertia bimaculata =

Species of plant

Swertia bimaculata is a plant species in the family Gentianaceae.
