= Swertia cordata =

Scientific classification
- Kingdom: Plantae
- Clade: Tracheophytes
- Clade: Angiosperms
- Clade: Eudicots
- Clade: Asterids
- Order: Gentianales
- Family: Gentianaceae
- Genus: Swertia
- Species: S. cordata

Binomial name
- Swertia cordata (Wall. ex G. Don) C.B. Clarke

Synonyms
- Ophelia cordata Wall. ex G. Don; Ophelia cordata var. laxa Griseb

Species of plant

Swertia cordata is an important medicinal plant of the family Gentianaceae and is found distributed throughout temperate regions of the Himalaya. The species used in various ethnomedicinal systems and as an adulterant of Swertia chirayita.
