= Dicerandrol C =

Names
- Preferred IUPAC name (5R,5′R,6R,6′R,10aR,10′aR)-10a,10′a-Bis[(acetyloxy)methyl]-1,1′,8,8′-tetrahydroxy-6,6′-dimethyl-9,9′-dioxo-5,5′,7,7′,9,9′,10a,10′a-octahydro-6H,6′H-[2,2′-bixanthene]-5,5′-diyl diacetate

Identifiers
CAS Number	361445-55-8
3D model (JSmol)	Interactive image
ChEBI	CHEBI:65766
ChEMBL	ChEMBL507894
ChemSpider	10213918
PubChem CID	11093875
CompTox Dashboard (EPA)	DTXSID401336290
- InChI: InChI=1S/C38H38O16/c1-15-11-23(43)29-33(47)27-25(53-37(29,13-49-17(3)39)35(15)51-19(5)41)9-7-21(31(27)45)22-8-10-26-28(32(22)46)34(48)30-24(44)12-16(2)36(52-20(6)42)38(30,54-26)14-50-18(4)40/h7-10,15-16,35-36,45-48H,11-14H2,1-6H3/t15-,16-,35-,36-,37+,38+/m1/s1 Key: KYQPTDIMYDSMHS-ACMZUNAXSA-N
- SMILES: CC1CC(=O)C2=C(C3=C(C=CC(=C3O)C4=C(C5=C(C=C4)OC6(C(C(CC(=O)C6=C5O)C)OC(=O)C)COC(=O)C)O)OC2(C1OC(=O)C)COC(=O)C)O

Properties
Chemical formula	C_{38}H_{38}O_{16}
Molar mass	750.70 g/mol
- Except where otherwise noted, data are given for materials in their standard state (at 25 °C [77 °F], 100 kPa). Infobox references

Dicerandrol C is a natural product. It is a less toxic isomer of phomoxanthone A (PXA) and phomoxanthone B (PXB), all three of which are members of the class of phomoxanthone compounds. The phomoxanthones are named after the fungus Phomopsis, from which they were first isolated, and after their xanthonoid structure. Chemically, they are dimers of two tetrahydroxanthones that are covalently linked to each other. Dicerandrol C itself is a homodimer of two identical diacetylated tetrahydroxanthones. The position of the link between the two tetrahydroxanthones is the only structural difference between dicerandrol C and its isomers PXA and PXB: In PXA, the two xanthonoid monomers are symmetrically linked at C-4,4’, while in PXB, they are asymmetrically linked at C-2,4’, and in dicerandrol C, they are symmetrically linked at C-2,2’.
