= 2alpha-hydroxytaxane 2-O-benzoyltransferase =

Enzyme

2-alpha-hydroxytaxane 2-O-benzoyltransferase

Identifiers
- EC no.: 2.3.1.166
- CAS no.: 329318-50-5

Databases
- IntEnz: IntEnz view
- BRENDA: BRENDA entry
- ExPASy: NiceZyme view
- KEGG: KEGG entry
- MetaCyc: metabolic pathway
- PRIAM: profile
- PDB structures: RCSB PDB PDBe PDBsum
- Gene Ontology: AmiGO / QuickGO
Search
- PMC: articles
- PubMed: articles
- NCBI: proteins

In enzymology, a 2alpha-hydroxytaxane 2-O-benzoyltransferase (EC 2.3.1.166) is an enzyme that catalyzes the chemical reaction

benzoyl-CoA + 10-deacetyl-2-debenzoylbaccatin III $\rightleftharpoons$ CoA + 10-deacetylbaccatin III

Thus, the two substrates of this enzyme are benzoyl-CoA and 10-deacetyl-2-debenzoylbaccatin III, whereas its two products are CoA and 10-deacetylbaccatin III.

This enzyme belongs to the family of transferases, specifically those acyltransferases transferring groups other than aminoacyl groups. The systematic name of this enzyme class is benzoyl-CoA:taxan-2alpha-ol O-benzoyltransferase. This enzyme is also called benzoyl-CoA:taxane 2alpha-O-benzoyltransferase. This enzyme participates in diterpenoid biosynthesis.
