= Phomoxanthone =

Class of chemical compounds

Phomoxanthone A

Phomoxanthone B

Dicerandrol C

The phomoxanthones are a loosely defined class of natural products. The two founding members of this class are phomoxanthone A and phomoxanthone B. Other compounds were later also classified as phomoxanthones, although a unifying nomenclature has not yet been established. The structure of all phomoxanthones is derived from a dimer of two covalently linked tetrahydroxanthones, and they differ mainly in the position of this link as well as in the acetylation status of their hydroxy groups. The phomoxanthones are structurally closely related to other tetrahydroxanthone dimers such as the secalonic acids and the eumitrins. While most phomoxanthones were discovered in fungi of the genus Phomopsis, most notably in the species Phomopsis longicolla, some have also been found in Penicillium sp.

== Known phomoxanthones ==
- Dicerandrol A
- Dicerandrol B
- Dicerandrol C
- Penexanthone A
- Phomolactonexanthone A
- Phomolactonexanthone B
- Phomoxanthone A and its derivatives:
  - 1-acetylphomoxanthone A
  - 1,1′-diacetylphomoxanthone A
  - 1,1′,8-triacetylphomoxanthone A
  - 1,1′,8,8′-tetraacetylphomoxanthone A
  - 12-deacetylphomoxanthone A
  - 12,12′-dideacetylphomoxanthone A (deacetylphomoxanthone C)
  - 12,12′,13,13′-tetradeacetylphomoxanthone A (deacetylphomoxanthone A)
- Phomoxanthone B and its derivatives:
  - 12-deacetylphomoxanthone B
  - 12,12′,13,13′-tetradeacetylphomoxanthone B (deacetylphomoxanthone B)
