= Swertia punicea =

Scientific classification
- Kingdom: Plantae
- Clade: Tracheophytes
- Clade: Angiosperms
- Clade: Eudicots
- Clade: Asterids
- Order: Gentianales
- Family: Gentianaceae
- Genus: Swertia
- Species: S. punicea

Binomial name
- Swertia punicea Hemsl.

Species of plant

Swertia punicea is a species of flowering plant in the family Gentianaceae.

The xanthonoids methylswertianin and bellidifolin can be isolated from S. punicea.
