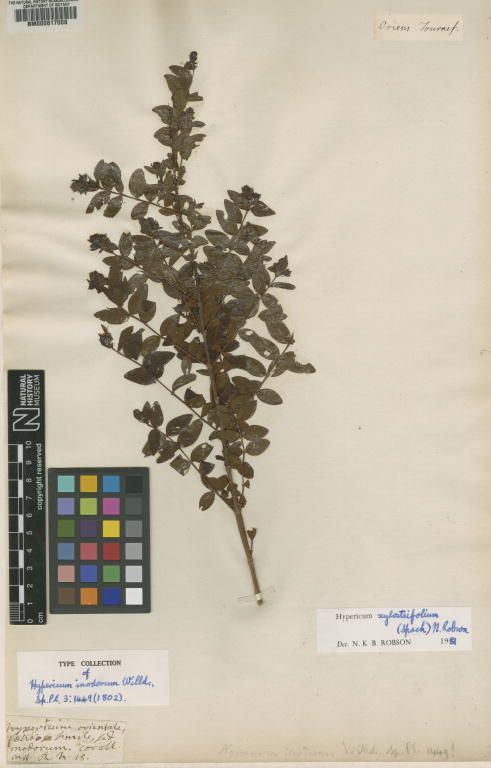

Scientific classification
- Kingdom: Plantae
- Clade: Tracheophytes
- Clade: Angiosperms
- Clade: Eudicots
- Clade: Rosids
- Order: Malpighiales
- Family: Hypericaceae
- Genus: Hypericum
- Section: Hypericum sect. Inodora; Stef.
- Species: H. xylosteifolium

Binomial name
- Hypericum xylosteifolium (Spach) N. Robson

Synonyms
- Androsaemum adenophyllum; A. xylosteifolium; H. adenophyllum; H. inodorum var. glandulosum; H. inodorum var. integrisepalum; H. inodorum var. intermedium; H. inodorum var. multiflorum; H. inodorum var. sommieri; H. inodorum var. subuniflorum; H. ramosissimum; H. ramosissimum var. intermedium; H. ramosissimum var. multiflorum; H. ramosissimum var. subuniflorum; H. rariflorum

= Hypericum xylosteifolium =

Species of flowering plant in the St John's wort family

Hypericum xylosteifolium is a flowering plant in the St. John's wort family, Hypericaceae. It is the only species in Hypericum sect. Inodora.

== Distribution ==
The species is found in northeast Turkey and southwest Georgia.

== Description ==
The species grows up to 1.5 metres (4 ft 11 in) tall. Its petals are golden yellow and its seeds are pale tan.
