= Anthranilate N-benzoyltransferase =

Identifiers
- EC no.: 2.3.1.144
- CAS no.: 125498-59-1

Databases
- IntEnz: IntEnz view
- BRENDA: BRENDA entry
- ExPASy: NiceZyme view
- KEGG: KEGG entry
- MetaCyc: metabolic pathway
- PRIAM: profile
- PDB structures: RCSB PDB PDBe PDBsum
- Gene Ontology: AmiGO / QuickGO
Search
- PMC: articles
- PubMed: articles
- NCBI: proteins

Anthranilate N-benzoyltransferase (EC 2.3.1.144) is an enzyme that catalyzes the chemical reaction

anthranilic acid
+
benzoyl-CoA
N-benzoylanthranilic acid
+ coenzyme A

The two substrates of this enzyme characterised from Dianthus caryophyllus are anthranilic acid and benzoyl-CoA. Its products are N-benzoylanthranilic acid and coenzyme A. The product is further transformed into a phytoalexin.

This enzyme belongs to the family of transferases, specifically those acyltransferases transferring groups other than aminoacyl groups. The systematic name of this enzyme class is benzoyl-CoA:anthranilate N-benzoyltransferase.
