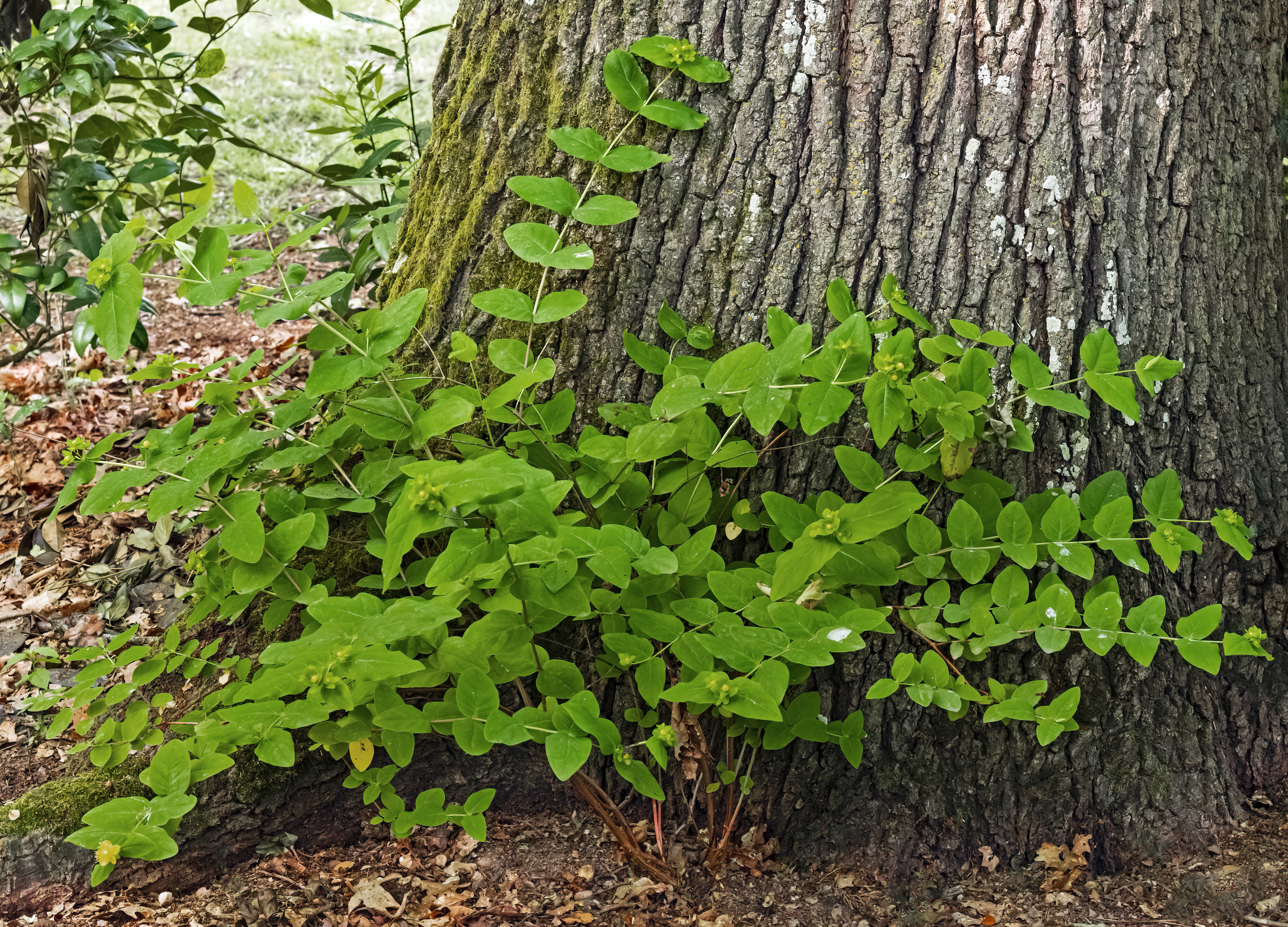
- Habit

Scientific classification
- Kingdom: Plantae
- Clade: Tracheophytes
- Clade: Angiosperms
- Clade: Eudicots
- Clade: Rosids
- Order: Malpighiales
- Family: Hypericaceae
- Genus: Hypericum
- Section: Hypericum sect. Androsaemum
- Species: H. androsaemum

Binomial name
- Hypericum androsaemum L.

Synonyms
- Androsaemum androsaemum (L.) Huth; A. floridum Salisb.; A. officinale All.; A. vulgare Gaertn.; Hypericum bacciferum Lam.; H. bacciforme Bubani; H. floridum Salisb.; H. webbianum G.Nicholson

= Hypericum androsaemum =

Species of flowering plant in the St John's wort family

Hypericum androsaemum, the shrubby St. John's wort, is a species of flowering plant in the family Hypericaceae. It is commonly called tutsan or sweet-amber. It forms a shrub with circle-shaped leaves and blue flowers.

The species has been known since before the modern system of taxonomy was developed, and was first described by Carl Linnaeus in 1768. Since then, it has been invalidly published under several synonyms, and was repeatedly placed in its own genus named Androsaemum. When Norman Robson published his monograph of the genus Hypericum in 1996, the species was definitively placed within Hypericum sect. Androsaemum, a small section including several other closely related species.

The species is native to Western Europe, North Africa and the Middle East, but has been introduced elsewhere in temperate areas with high rainfall, including Australia and New Zealand. In these countries, it is often considered a noxious weed. The plant is easily dispersed across wide ranges because of its small and numerous seeds, and methods for biological control are required to manage the species.

It is cultivated as an ornamental plant because of its striking green-tinted foliage, bright yellow petals, and its large clusters of fruit. Cultivars like 'Albury Purple' and 'Golden Tutsan' have leaves with more pronounced purple and golden coloring, respectively.

== Description ==
Hypericum androsaemum is a small bushy shrub, reaching 30–70 centimetres (12–28 in) tall. It has many stems which remain upright and erect instead of creeping over the ground. It has many oval-shaped leaves along its stems which are typically green with a red tint. The leaves have small glands on their surface that can be seen upon close inspection; these are filled with a red pigment. The plant has yellow flowers 1.5–2.5 cm in diameter with five petals and numerous stamens. Uniquely among Hypericum, its berries turn from red to black and remain soft and fleshy even after ripening. The plant's stems are cylindrical in shape when the plant is mature. The bark on the stems has longitudinal grooves or scale-like patterns.

=== Foliage ===
A single stem with foliage and flowers

The leaves are arranged in opposite pairs without stipules and lack petioles. The leaf blade is 4–12 cm (1.6–4.7 in) long by 2–8 cm (0.8–3.1 in) wide. The leaves lack hairs on either surface and have small oil glands across their surface. When these glands are crushed, they give off a pungent aroma and leak red pigment. There are other translucent glands that are dispersed throughout the mesophyll at differing depths. There are four or five symmetrical pairs of main veins along the leaf that point in the direction of the tip.

=== Inflorescence ===
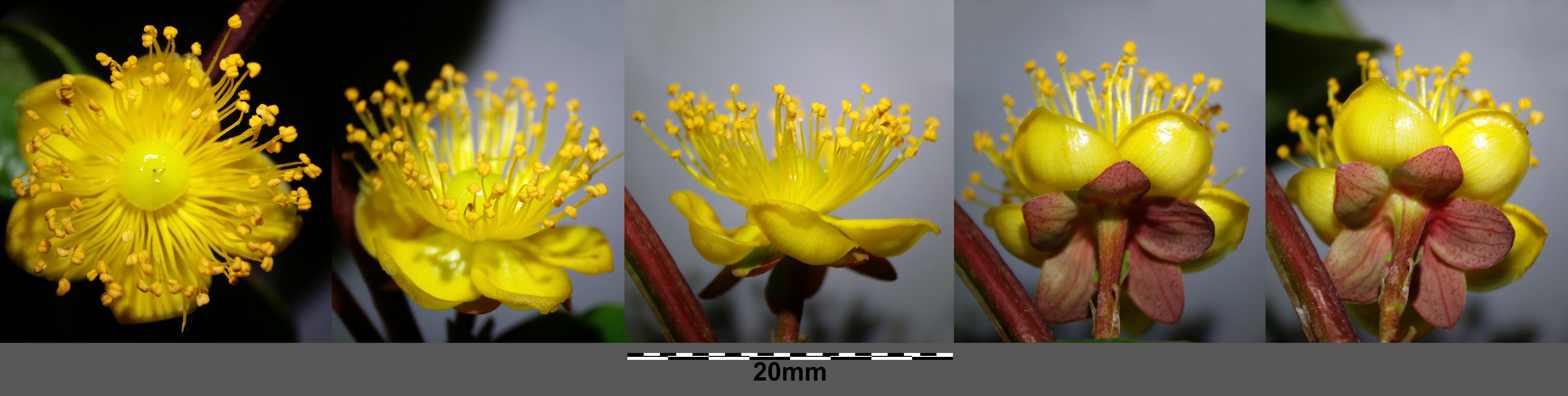
Different angles of the small inflorescence

Hypericum androsaemum has between one and eleven flowers on an inflorescence, which has the form of a cyme and a corymb-like arrangement. There are never accessory flowers, but there are sometimes one to three flowering branches from the lower node. The pedicel stems are 8–14 mm long, with small lance-shaped bracts.

The flowers are 15–25 mm in diameter and have globe-shaped buds. The sepals are very unequal in size, about 6–12 mm long by 3–7 mm wide in an egg shape. The flower petals are a bright golden yellow without the red tinge that is present in the foliage. They curve inward and have an egg-like shape. The stamens are arranged in five fascicles of twenty to twenty-five stamens the longest of which are 7–11 mm long. The ovaries measure 4–5 mm long and 3.5–5 mm wide in the shape of a rough globe.

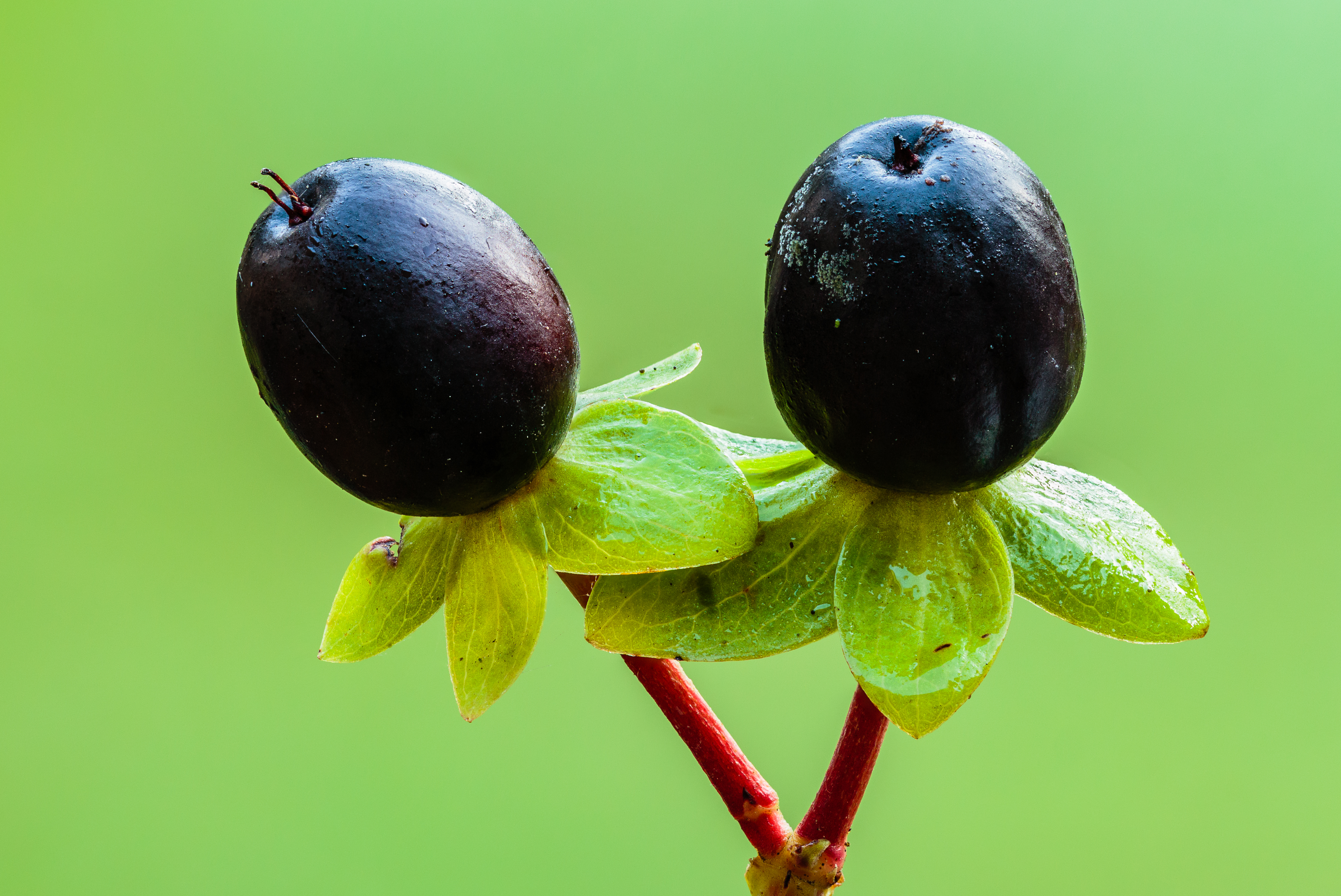
The berries of H. androsaemum turn black after maturity.

The berries of the plant turn from red to a unique black color not found in any other Hypericum species, which is caused by a xanthone present only in Hypericum androsaemum. Another unique characteristic of the species' berries is that they remain fleshy and mostly soft when they ripen, instead of hardening and drying out like other related species. The berries measure 7–12 mm long and 6–8 mm wide with thin casings. The seeds inside are a reddish-brown color.

=== Phytochemistry ===
Hypericum androsaemum has a well-studied phytochemical profile as a result of its use as folk medicine and an herbal supplement. More than eighty essential compounds have been identified from its leaves. The total density of essential oil has been recorded as high as 0.34%. Several different sesquiterpene hydrocarbons dominate the profile, and intermediate and long chain alkenes are highly present. Less prolific compounds include caryophyllene and gurjunene. Many of these essential oils and other phenolic compounds are present in higher quantities while the flowers are still growing. While less studied than the leaves of the plant, the berries of H. androsaemum are rich in chemical constituents as well. Many of these constituents are found in higher densities (or only) while the fruits are red. The most present chemicals are chlorogenic acid, shikimic acid, rutin, epicatechin, and hyperoside.

=== Similar species ===
Hypericum androsaemum is similar in appearance to the other species in section Androsaemum. It can be told apart from H. foliosum and H. × inodorum by its shorter styles, the unique black color of its ripe berries, and that its petals are never longer than its sepals. In addition to the species of section Androsaemum, it is highly similar to H. xylosteifolium, the sole species in section Inodorum. The most apparent morphological difference between it and H. xylosteifolium is that the seed capsules (berries) of the latter species dry completely when they are mature, whereas those of H. androsaemum remain soft and fleshy. The berries of H. androsaemum only dry if they are left on the plant for around a month after ripening, and will begin to wither at that same time.

Comparison of inflorescences of related species

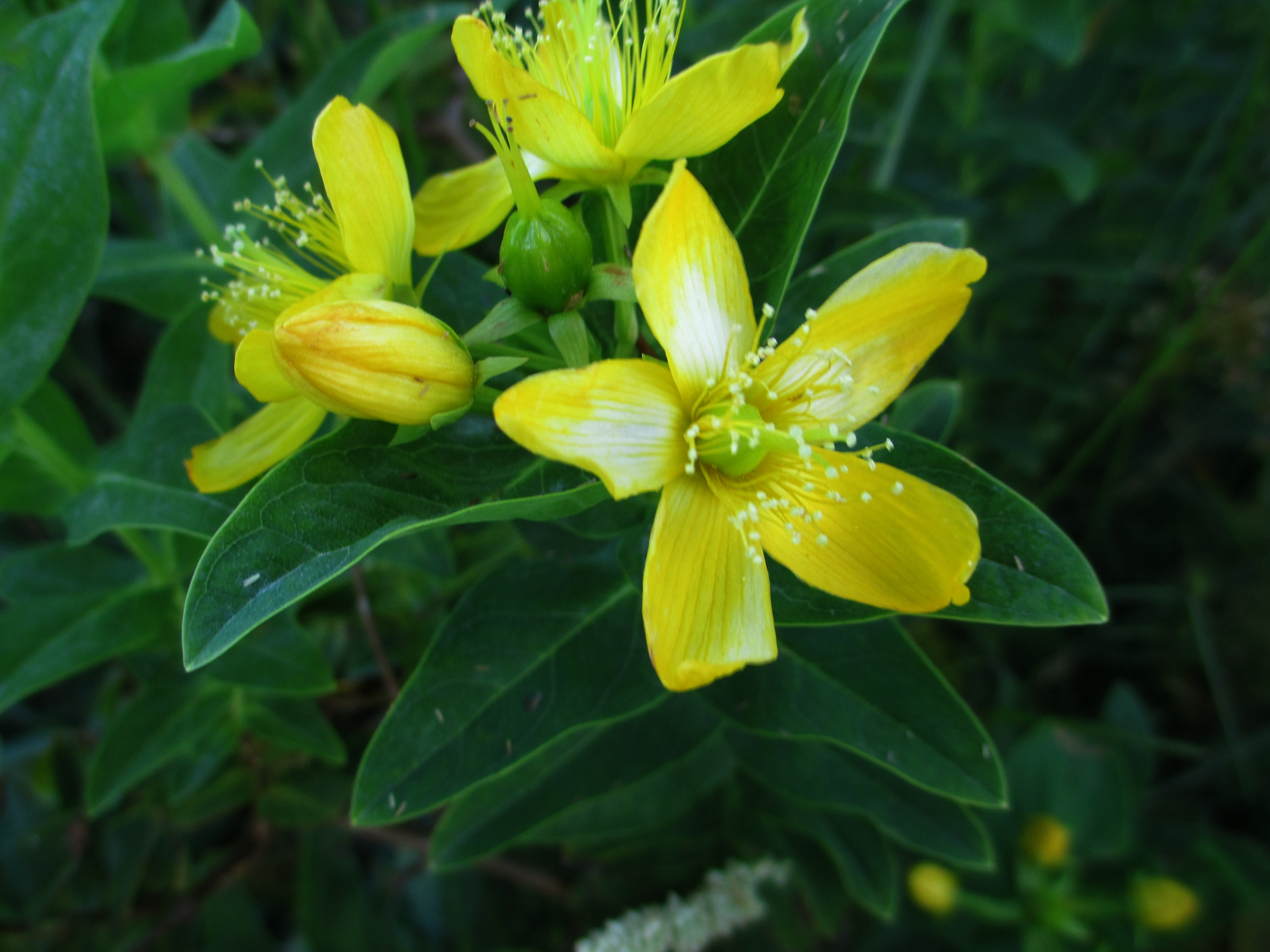
H. foliosum

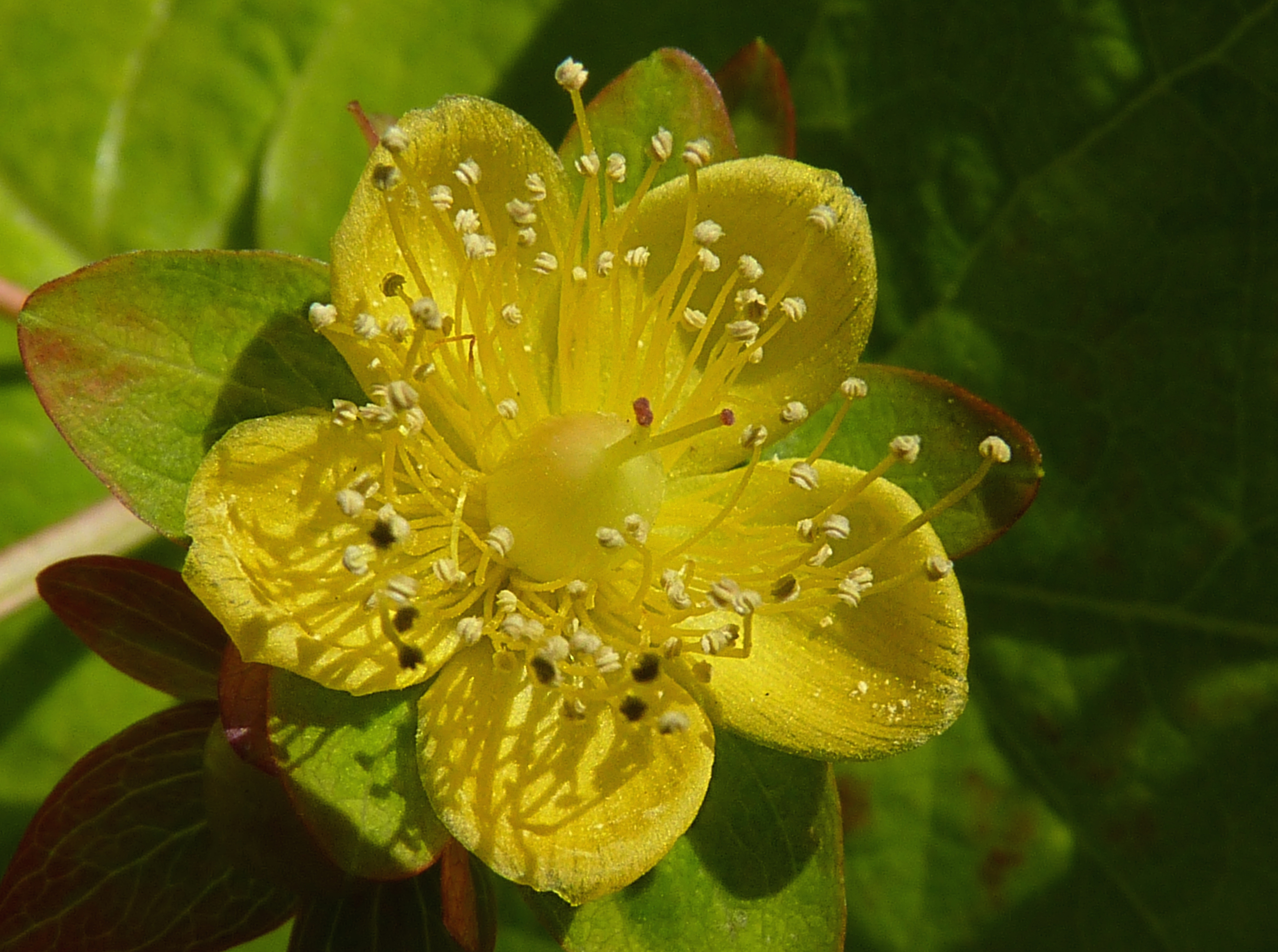
H. × inodorum

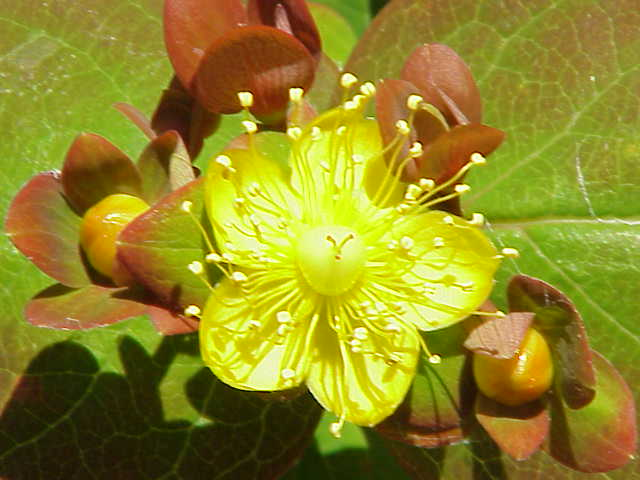
H. androsaemum

== Taxonomy ==
Hypericum androsaemum is the type species of the small section Hypericum sect. Androsaemum. The species' placement within Hypericum can be summarized as follows:

Hypericum

Hypericum subg. Hypericum

Hypericum sect. Androsaemum

H. androsaeumum – H. foliosum – H. grandifolium – H. hircinum – H. × inodorum

=== Nomenclature ===
The genus name Hypericum derives from the Greek words hyper, meaning above, and eikon, meaning picture. This refers to the practice of hanging the flower "above pictures" to ward off evil spirits. The specific epithet androsaemum comes from the Greek word androsaemus, which was used to describe plants with red sap. It is a combination of the words andros, meaning man, and haima, meaning blood. The common name tutsan is French in origin, and derives from the phrase tout-saine, which means heal-all, in reference to the plant's medicinal properties. Its alternative name sweet-amber is in reference to the ambergris-like aroma that is emitted when oil glands on its leaves are crushed. While Hypericum androsaemum is the most well-known plant named tutsan, other species share that common name. For example, H. xylosteifolium is called "Turkish tutsan" and H. hircinum is called "Stinking tutsan". The name St John's wort, also applied to other plants in this genus, comes from it flowering around the time of the Feast of John the Baptist or Midsummer.

=== History ===
Hypericum androsaemum was known and studied long before the modern system of taxonomy was developed. The species was first formally described in the modern system by Carl Linnaeus. He described the species as Hypericum androsaemum in the second volume of his Species Plantarum in 1763 alongside around twenty other Hypericum species. Compiling several brief notes from other authorities, Linnaeus gave the following description for the plant:

Floribus trigynis, fructu baccato, caule fruticoso acipiti. Foliis ovatis pedunculo longloribus.
With three-flowered inflorescence, bacciferous fruit (berries), and a bushy stem. With ovate leaves and long stalks.

In the same entry, Linnaeus noted the species' presence in England and its tendency to be found around fences. This original description and type specimen analysis by Linnaeus remains the basis for the modern definition of the species. However, since that original description numerous illegitimate synonyms have been created for various reasons. In fact, while there is now solid consensus that H. androsaemum belongs within the genus Hypericum, it was placed into a separate genus called Androsaemum as recently as 1893.

In 1796, the garden of Chapel Allerton published a list of their plant specimens, noting Hypericum androsaemum as being in their collection, along with the fact it had been described by Linnaeus. However, they still applied two superfluous names (Androsaemum floridum and Hypericum floridum) to their specimens; these names were never accepted as legitimate. Only one validly published heterotypic synonym for Hypericum androsaemum has arisen since its original description. In 1785, Carlo Allioni published a description of a specimen he called Androsaemum officinale, without referencing Linnaeus' original description of Hypericum androsaemum. Still, the description corroborated with the one given by Linnaeus and there is consensus that the specimen Allioni observed did, in fact, belong to Hypericum androsaemum and was not a separate species.

The status of Hypericum androsaemum was definitively resolved with Norman Robson's comprehensive monograph of the genus Hypericum in 1996. Robson established 36 sections within the genus which grouped together very similar species. He designated H. androsaemum as the type species of sect. Androsaemum and clarified its lectotype specimen. Because the actual type specimen that Linnaeus analyzed was not preserved, Robson selected an illustration from Hortus Cliffortianus, which Linnaeus would have at least seen, to serve as the lectotype for the species.

Synonyms
Name	Type	Author	Year	Journal			Notes
Name	Type	Author	Year	Title	Vol.	Page	Notes
Androsaemum androsaemum	Homotypic	(L.) Huth	1893	Helios	11	133	Not validly published
Androsaemum floridum	Homotypic	Salisb.	1796	Prodr. Stirp. Chap. Allerton		369	Superfluous name
Androsaemum officinale	Heterotypic	All.	1785	Fl. Pedem.	2	147	Heterotypic synonym
Androsaemum vulgare	Homotypic	Gaertn.	1788	Fruct. Sem. Pl.	1	282	
Hypericum bacciferum	Homotypic	Lam.	1779	Fl. Franç.	3	151	Superfluous name
Hypericum bacciforme	Homotypic	Bubani	1901	Fl. Pyren.	3	343	Superfluous name
Hypericum floridum	Homotypic	Salisb.	1796	Prodr. Stirp. Chap. Allerton		369	
Hypericum webbianum	Heterotypic	G.Nicholson	1894	Hand-List Trees Shrubs	1	37	Not validly published

=== Subdivision ===
Hypericum androsaemum exhibits a great deal of variation in appearance, especially in cultivation. When this variation is deliberately brought out through selective breeding, the resulting forms are called "cultivars"; however, when populations develop unique traits on their own while in cultivation, those populations can be described by a legitimate botanical name. In the case of H. androsaemum, two such names have been given: H. androsaemum var. aureum has yellow-green leaves, and H. androsaemum f. variegatum has variegated leaves.

In the wild, H. androsaemum exhibits a similarly wide range of physical traits. Larger-flowered plants tend to have red-tinted leaves and larger fruits; smaller-flowered plants have greener leaves and smaller fruits. These traits are not binary, though, and there is a continuous spectrum of forms that link those two extremes wherever they are found. Thus, no legitimate names are given to any of these forms.

== Distribution and habitat ==
The species has a wide native distribution, but is most densely found in Western Europe. It is particularly abundant across the British Isles (except for in the Scottish Highlands), in the Ardennes forest of Belgium and France, and on the western French coast. Other European populations include the Pyrenees Mountains, across northern Spain and Portugal, and around Genoa and parts of central Italy. Scattered sightings have been reported through Germany and as far north as Denmark, as well as in Switzerland, Austria, and the Balkans. Outside of Europe, H. androsaemum is found in northern Turkey, the North African coast, the Caucasus, and Iran. While it may have at one point been native to the island of Corsica, it is now believed to be extinct there.

Hypericum androsaemum has become naturalized or invasive in regions to which it is not native. In Australia, it is densely found in the Otway Ranges, South Gippsland Hills, Dandenong Ranges, the Blue Mountains, and in the area around Mansfield. There are also a few scattered populations on Tasmania, but it is not troublesome there. In New Zealand, it is found on both islands frequently enough to be an encroaching weed.

The plant is found in damp and shady areas at a great range of elevations, from low-lying regions up to 1,800 m (5,900 ft). It requires heavy rainfall, typically greater than 750 mm (30 in) of annual precipitation.

== Ecology ==
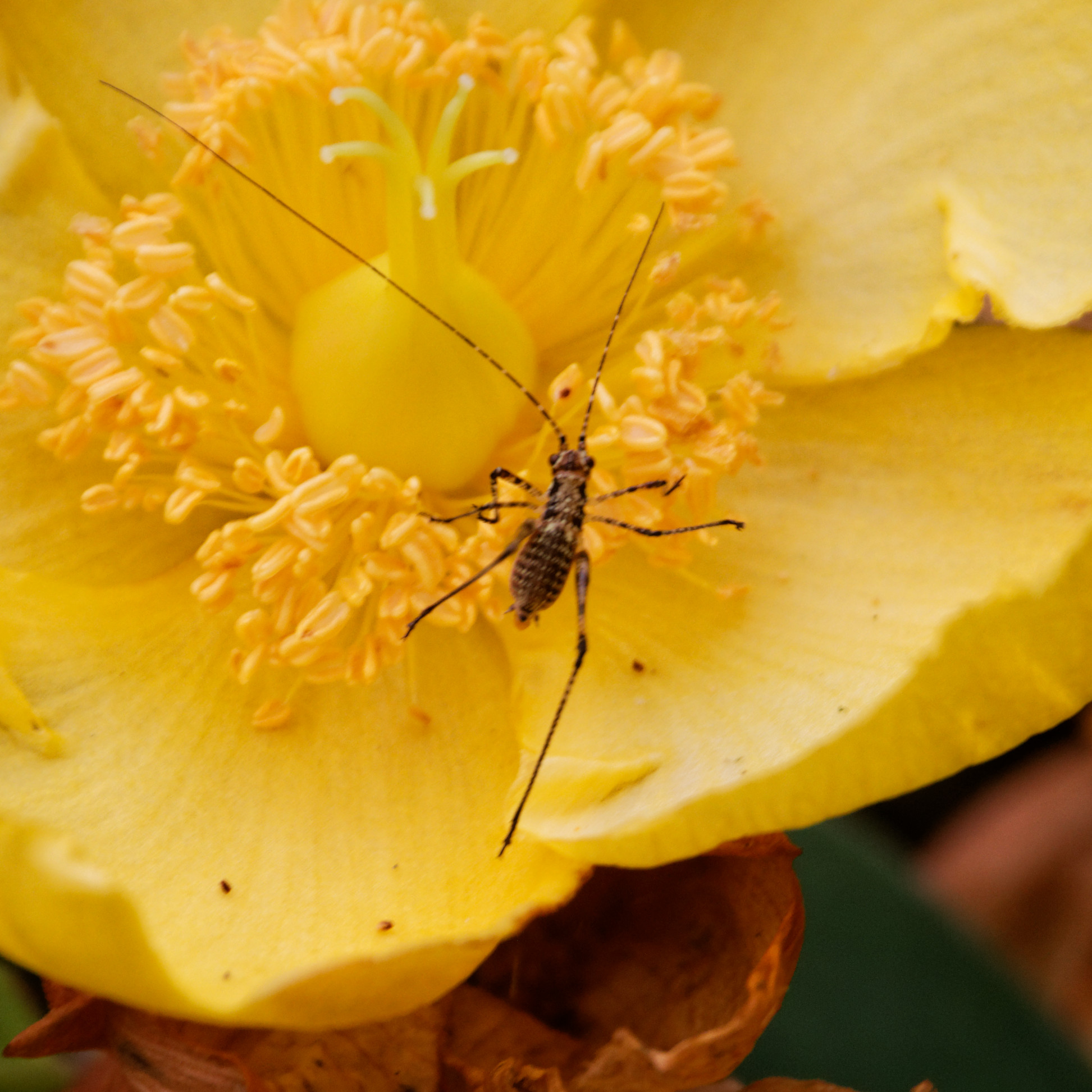
An Orthoptera larva on a flower of H. androsaemum

Seeds of H. androsaemum germinate in the fall. They flower when the plant is between 18 and 24 months old, typically from late spring to early summer, with the fruit ripening by late summer. The plant is partially deciduous, losing most of its foliage in the fall but with rapid regrowth every spring.

=== Invasiveness ===
In the late 19th century, H. androsaemum was a popular ornamental plant, leading to its widespread dispersal in non-native regions. While its seeds don't have any other special properties that increase their potential for dispersal, they are small and extremely numerous. This allows the seeds to easily contaminate cargo, animals, clothing, vehicles, or other transported items. The species was invasively introduced to Australia in 1865 via the Royal Horticultural Society's botanical garden in Hobart, apparently for use as an ornamental species because of its reddish leaves and bright yellow flowers. In New Zealand, the primary method of invasive dispersal is reportedly by birds.

In 2008, Landcare Research began investigating the feasibility of a biological control for the species. The seed and leaf-tip eating moth Lathronympha strigana and the leaf-feeding beetle Chrysolina abchasica were tested and found to be sufficiently host specific and not a risk to native plant species. As of February 2017, moths were released at 30 sites around the central North Island in New Zealand; however, the beetle is more difficult to rear in captivity, so only one release has been made so far.

== Cultivation ==
When cultivated, Hypericum androsaemum requires minimal maintenance. The species is generally pest and disease free, and is deer resistant. However, it can be prone to nematodes, which cause root rot; pest insects such as thrips and scale have been noted. Additionally, in hot and humid climates the species is susceptible to wilting and unrelated root rot. It is tolerant of moderately acidic and alkaline soils, and can withstand drought and freezing temperatures down to −20 °C (−4 °F). While the plant performs best if spaced roughly 90 cm (3 ft) apart from others, it will self-sow via seed in its area if allowed, creating ground cover. After the plant has lost its leaves in the fall, it can be cut back if needed and will regrow from the base in the spring.

Most Hypericum species are difficult to germinate because of heavy seed dormancy. Hypericum androsaemum exhibits both physiological dormancy and chemical dormancy, meaning that seed germination can be kickstarted by both physical and chemical factors. In particular, room-temperature water or the plant hormone gibberellic acid are most effective at bringing its seeds out of a dormant state.

New specimens are propagated by sowing non-dormant seeds in a 10 °C (50 °F) greenhouse in the spring under a very light layer of soil. Once the seedlings are large enough to handle (after 1–3 months), they are moved into individual pots. After the last frost of winter, the new plants are moved to their permanent outdoor locations. As an alternative method to seed propagation, cuttings of semi-hard wood 10–12 long are sometimes taken in the fall. These cuttings are then placed in a frame for the remainder of the fall and winter, and can be replanted the following spring.

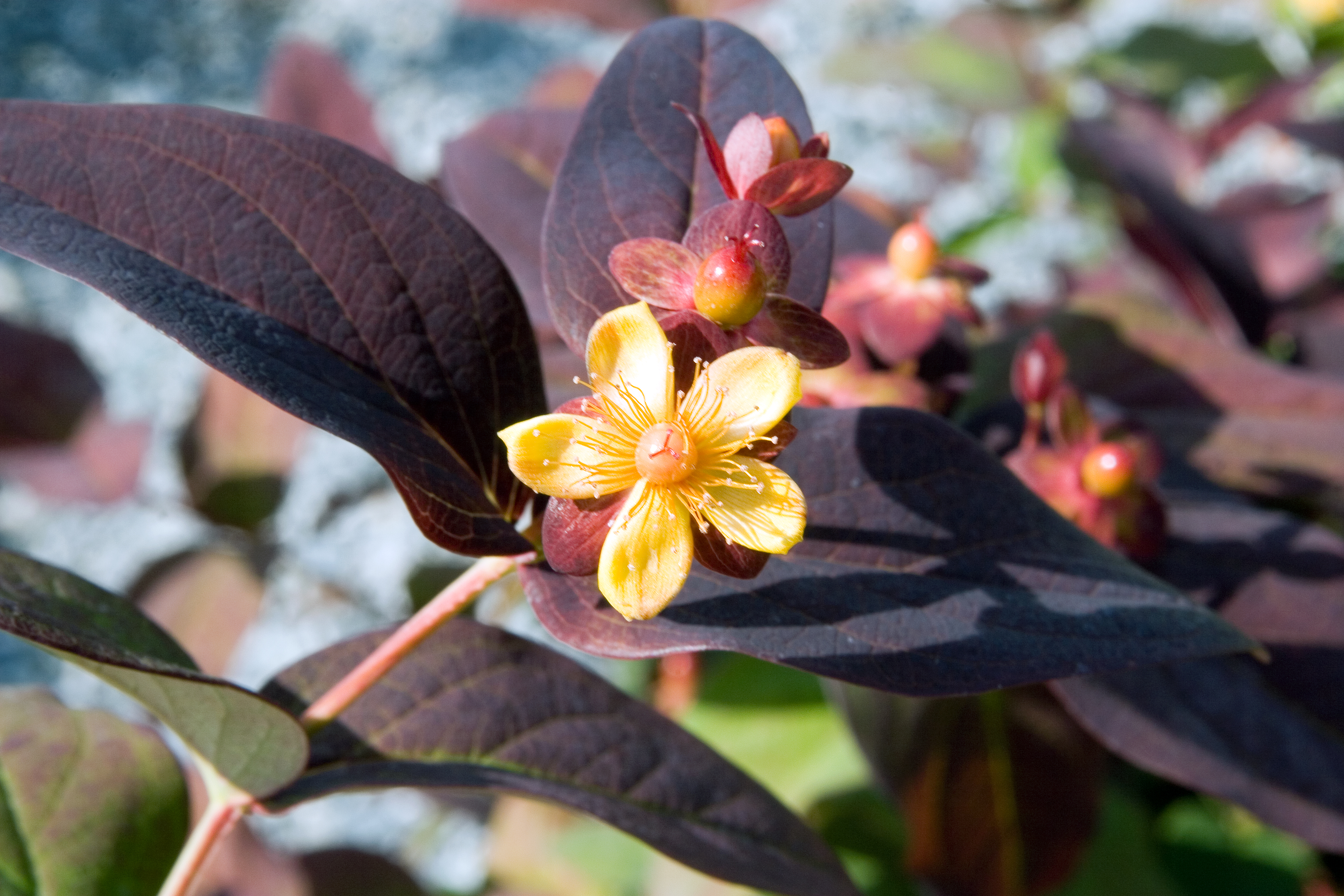
H. androsaemum 'Albury Purple'

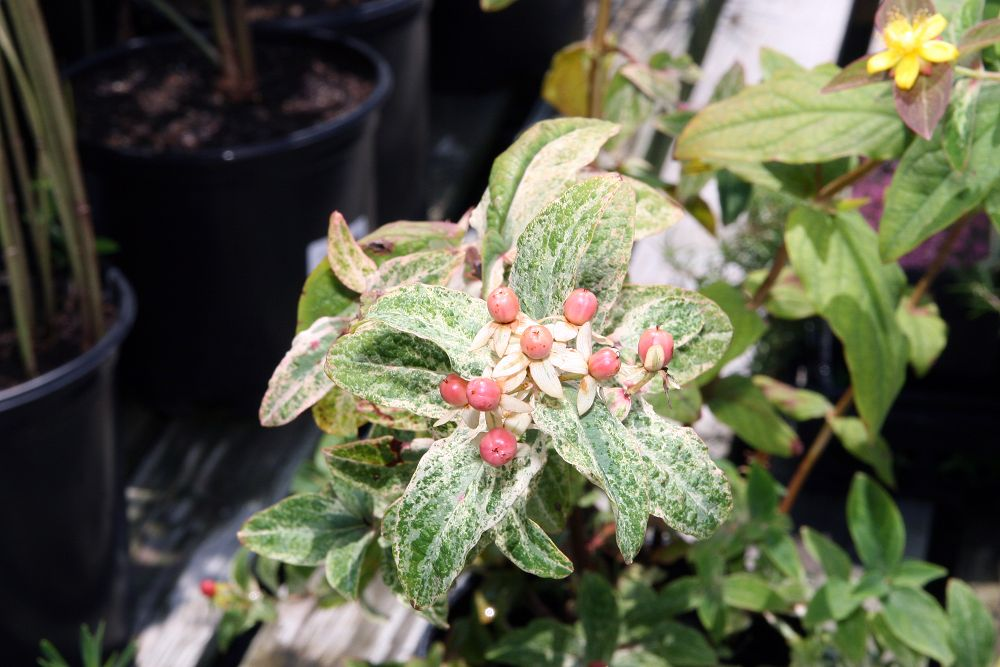
H. androsaemum 'Glacier'

=== Cultivars ===
In order to combat the invasive tendencies of Hypericum androsaemum, triploid clones of plants with desirable characteristics have been developed by several herbariums. These triploid specimens have been shown to have massively reduced male fertility and complete female infertility; in addition, they still produce the large and colorful fruits for which H. androsaemum is known, and at rates similar to regular diploid plants.

Selected cultivars
Name	Creator	Characteristics	Notes
'Albury Purple'		Leaves flushed purple, fruit more red	Also called 'Tedbury Purple'
'Glacier'		Leaves with primarily white variegation	
'Golden Tutsan'		Leaves golden	
'Matisse'	North Carolina State University	Leaves with green and white spotty variegation	Triploid
'Picasso'	North Carolina State University	Leaves with purple tint	Triploid
'Pollock'	North Carolina State University	Leaves with abstract color patterns	Triploid

== Uses ==
Like many other Hypericum species, H. androsaemum is a medicinal plant used in folk medicine. For example, it is used as a diuretic, to treat sciatica and gout, and to stem bleeding and accelerate healing from burns and minor wounds. Because H. androsaemum does not contain hypericin, a chemical present in other Hypericum species that can cause skin irritation and other undesirable side effects, the plant is more widely used in topical applications and skincare. This trait makes the species useful as an antidepressant as well, and testing has demonstrated that it appears to be at least as effective as H. perforatum in that regard. In Portugal, the leaves are used to treat liver, kidney, and bladder ailments, while in England they are mixed with lard to make an ointment to put on cuts or other wounds. The antioxidant properties of the berries of H. androsaemum have been confirmed in laboratory testing, lending credence to their use in teas as antihepatotoxics or diuretics.
