= Gambogic acid =

Names
- Preferred IUPAC name (2Z)-4-[(1R,3aS,5S,11R,14aS)-8-Hydroxy-3,3,11-trimethyl-13-(3-methylbut-2-en-1-yl)-11-(4-methylpent-3-en-1-yl)-7,15-dioxo-3a,4,5,7-tetrahydro-1H,3H,11H-1,5-methanofuro[3,4-g]pyrano[3,2-b]xanthen-1-yl]-2-methylbut-2-enoic acid
- Other names β-Guttiferin

Identifiers
CAS Number	2752-65-0
3D model (JSmol)	Interactive image
ChEMBL	ChEMBL555017
ChemSpider	8027898
ECHA InfoCard	100.159.336
PubChem CID	5281632; 9852185
UNII	8N585K83U2
CompTox Dashboard (EPA)	DTXSID101029723
- InChI: InChI=1S/C38H44O8/c1-20(2)10-9-15-36(8)16-14-24-29(39)28-30(40)26-18-23-19-27-35(6,7)46-37(33(23)41,17-13-22(5)34(42)43)38(26,27)45-32(28)25(31(24)44-36)12-11-21(3)4/h10-11,13-14,16,18,23,27,39H,9,12,15,17,19H2,1-8H3,(H,42,43)/b22-13-/t23-,27+,36-,37+,38-/m1/s1 Key: GEZHEQNLKAOMCA-RRZNCOCZSA-N; InChI=1/C38H44O8/c1-20(2)10-9-15-36(8)16-14-24-29(39)28-30(40)26-18-23-19-27-35(6,7)46-37(33(23)41,17-13-22(5)34(42)43)38(26,27)45-32(28)25(31(24)44-36)12-11-21(3)4/h10-11,13-14,16,18,23,27,39H,9,12,15,17,19H2,1-8H3,(H,42,43)/b22-13-/t23-,27+,36-,37+,38-/m1/s1 Key: GEZHEQNLKAOMCA-RRZNCOCZBX
- SMILES: O=C1/C4=C/[C@H]6C(=O)[C@@]5(OC([C@@H]([C@]45Oc3c1c(O)c2\C=C/[C@@](Oc2c3C\C=C(/C)C)(C)CC\C=C(/C)C)C6)(C)C)C/C=C(\C(=O)O)C

Properties
Chemical formula	C_{38}H_{44}O_{8}
Molar mass	628.762 g·mol^{−1}
Appearance	Amorphous orange solid
Density	1.29 g/cm^{3}
- Except where otherwise noted, data are given for materials in their standard state (at 25 °C [77 °F], 100 kPa). verify (what is ?) Infobox references

Gambogic acid is a xanthonoid that is derived from the brownish or orange resin from Garcinia hanburyi. Garcinia hanburyi is a small to medium-sized evergreen tree (up to approximately 15 m in height) with smooth grey bark. It is native to Cambodia, southern Vietnam, and Thailand and has been successfully introduced in Singapore.

== Original uses ==
Gambogic acid is the principal pigment of gambooge resin which, in addition to early traditional medicinal uses in Southeast Asia, is also a sought after dye due to the bright orange color it imparts to cloth. According to traditional Chinese medical documentation, gamboge was described as poisonous and acidic and possessed the ability to detoxify, kill parasites, and stop bleeding as a hemostatic agent. Gambogic acid has also been used in various food preparations in Asian cultures.

== Research ==
Some pharmacological research on gambogic acid has been conducted in vitro and in laboratory animals, but there are no proven clinical effects in humans.

=== Effects on tumor growth in mice ===
In studies conducted with mice and transplanted tumors (from human lung carcinoma SPC-A1 cells), tumor growth remained suppressed for up to 21 days during treatment with gambogic acid. The ratio of relative tumor volume (RTV) for the treated group of mice to the control group indicates the gambogic acid was having an impact on tumor size while having no adverse effects on body weight or mortality. Tumor volume was measured twice each week during the study, and the ratio of treated to control group tumor volume ranged from 45.0% to 72.7% for the 8 mg/kg dose and from 55.6% to 78.8% for the 4 mg/kg dose. Tumor growth rate shows a dependence on the dose of gambogic acid, with the 8 mg/kg dose providing improved results at suppressing tumor growth in these trials.

In 2007, a research project focused on the mechanisms involved with gambogic acid's antitumor activity. Results supported the hypothesis that gambogic acid works to suppress nuclear factor-κΒ (NF-κΒ) activation that is induced by various inflammatory agents and carcinogens. In multiple myeloma, osteoclastogenesis is very common in which patients suffer from weakening of the bones. Gambogic acid inhibits such osteoclastogenesis by inhibiting CXCR4 signaling pathways. Gambogic acid has also been found to bind to transferrin receptor1 (TfR) and rapidly induce cell apoptosis without competing with the transferrin (Tf) binding site. A brief exposure to this compound resulted in a rapid start to apoptosis, including membrane blebbing within 15 minutes.

=== Effects on cell growth ===
The effect of gambogic acid on the growth of SPC-A1 cells was also investigated. Cells were cultured with various concentrations of gambogic acid, and then living cells were counted. The results indicate that both the concentration of gambogic acid used to treat the cells as well as the length of treatment affected the growth inhibiting factor. For the same length of exposure, the higher the concentration of gambogic acid that was administered, the greater the effect on inhibiting cell growth. When comparing cultures at the same dose, the longer the cells were exposed to gambogic acid, the higher the growth inhibition. Results indicate that cell growth is dependent on both the magnitude of the dose administered as well as the length of time exposed to gambogic acid.

=== Effects on telomerase activity ===
Enhanced telomerase activity can be an indicator of abnormal cells. Most normal tissues have inactivated or repressed telomerase activity, but it becomes activated in germ cells and most malignant tumors. Treatment of SPC-A1 cells with gambogic acid resulted in a significant decline in telomerase activity when treated for 48 or 72 hours (detecting 80.7% and 84.9% reduction in activity, respectively). When treated with gambogic acid for only 24 hours, the decrease was only 25.9% which led researchers to believe there are at least two mechanisms responsible for slowing cell growth.

== Toxicity ==
A high dose of gambogic acid showed slight side effects on the mouse central nervous system. In mice gambogic acid causes developmental toxicity in a dose-dependent manner, including low birth weight and inhibitory effects on fetal skeletal development. Analyzing mice that received the 4 mg/kg and 8 mg/kg doses, there was no substantial weight loss, no gastrointestinal reactions to medication, no obvious changes in any vital organs, and no fatalities. Previous toxicity experiments at the 30 mg/kg and 60 mg/kg level also concluded that there were no significant changes to vital organs (such as the liver, heart, spleen, kidneys, lungs, testicles, and uterus) as well as no changes in body weight or white blood cells in peripheral blood. At the highest level of 120 mg/kg the primary toxic target organs were the liver and kidneys. At high doses in rats, the primary target of toxicity was found to be the kidney and liver.
