= Benzophenone synthase =

Identifiers
- EC no.: 2.3.1.151
- CAS no.: 175780-21-9

Databases
- IntEnz: IntEnz view
- BRENDA: BRENDA entry
- ExPASy: NiceZyme view
- KEGG: KEGG entry
- MetaCyc: metabolic pathway
- PRIAM: profile
- PDB structures: RCSB PDB PDBe PDBsum
- Gene Ontology: AmiGO / QuickGO
Search
- PMC: articles
- PubMed: articles
- NCBI: proteins

Benzophenone synthase (EC 2.3.1.151) is an enzyme that catalyzes a chemical reaction which takes one unit of 3-hydroxybenzoyl-CoA and combines this with three units of malonyl-CoA to give the benzophenone, 2,3',4,6-tetrahydroxybenzophenone, as product. Four units of coenzyme A and three of carbon dioxide are byproducts. The enzyme was characterised from the plant Centaurium erythraea. The product is an intermediate in the biosynthesis of xanthones.

3-hydroxybenzoyl-CoA
+ 3
malonyl-CoA
3 CO_{2}
2,3',4,6-tetrahydroxybenzophenone
+ 4
coenzyme A

This enzyme belongs to the family of transferases, specifically those acyltransferases transferring groups other than aminoacyl groups. The systematic name of this enzyme class is malonyl-CoA:3-hydroxybenzoyl-CoA malonyltransferase.
