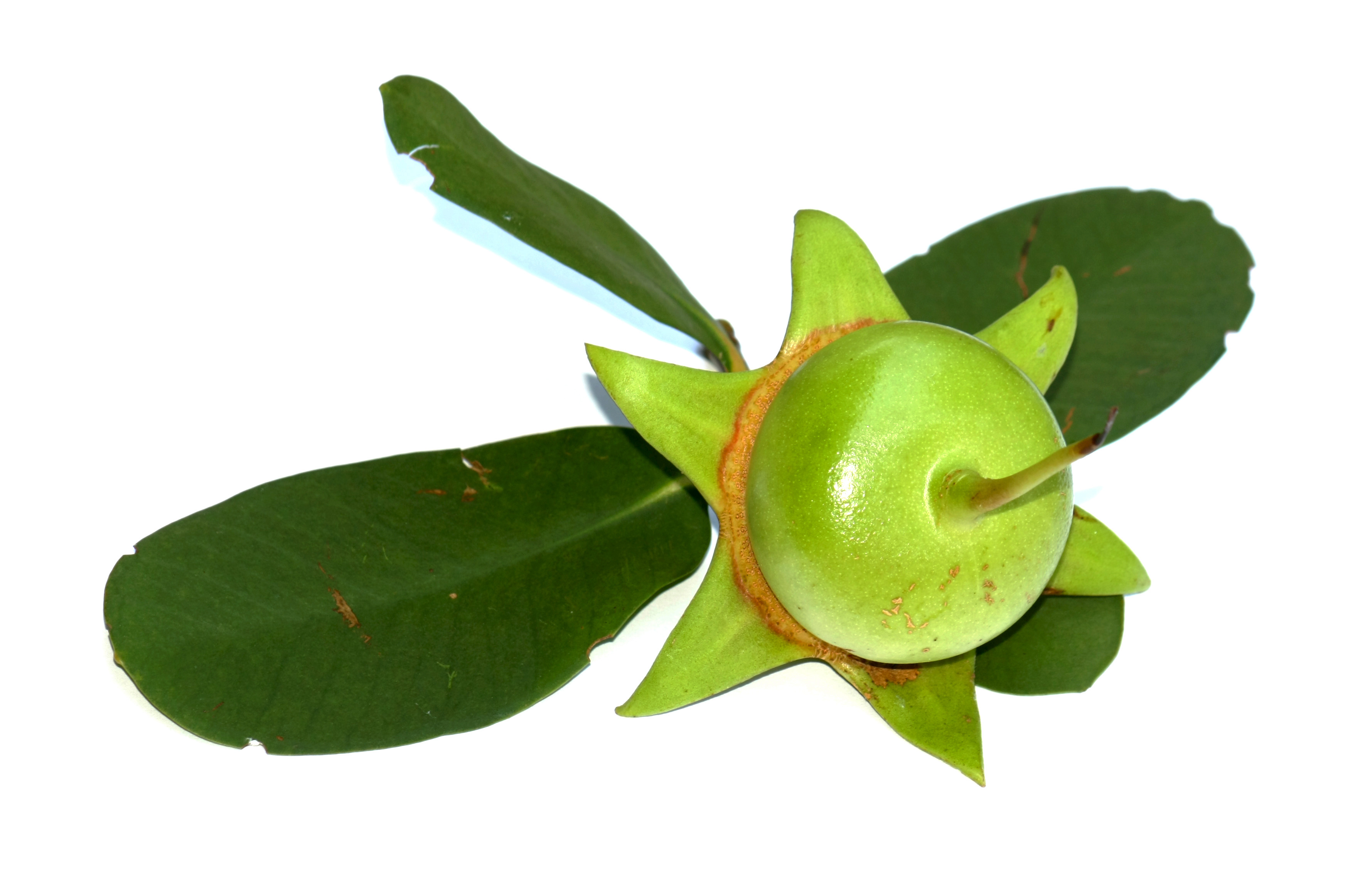
- Unripened mangrove apple
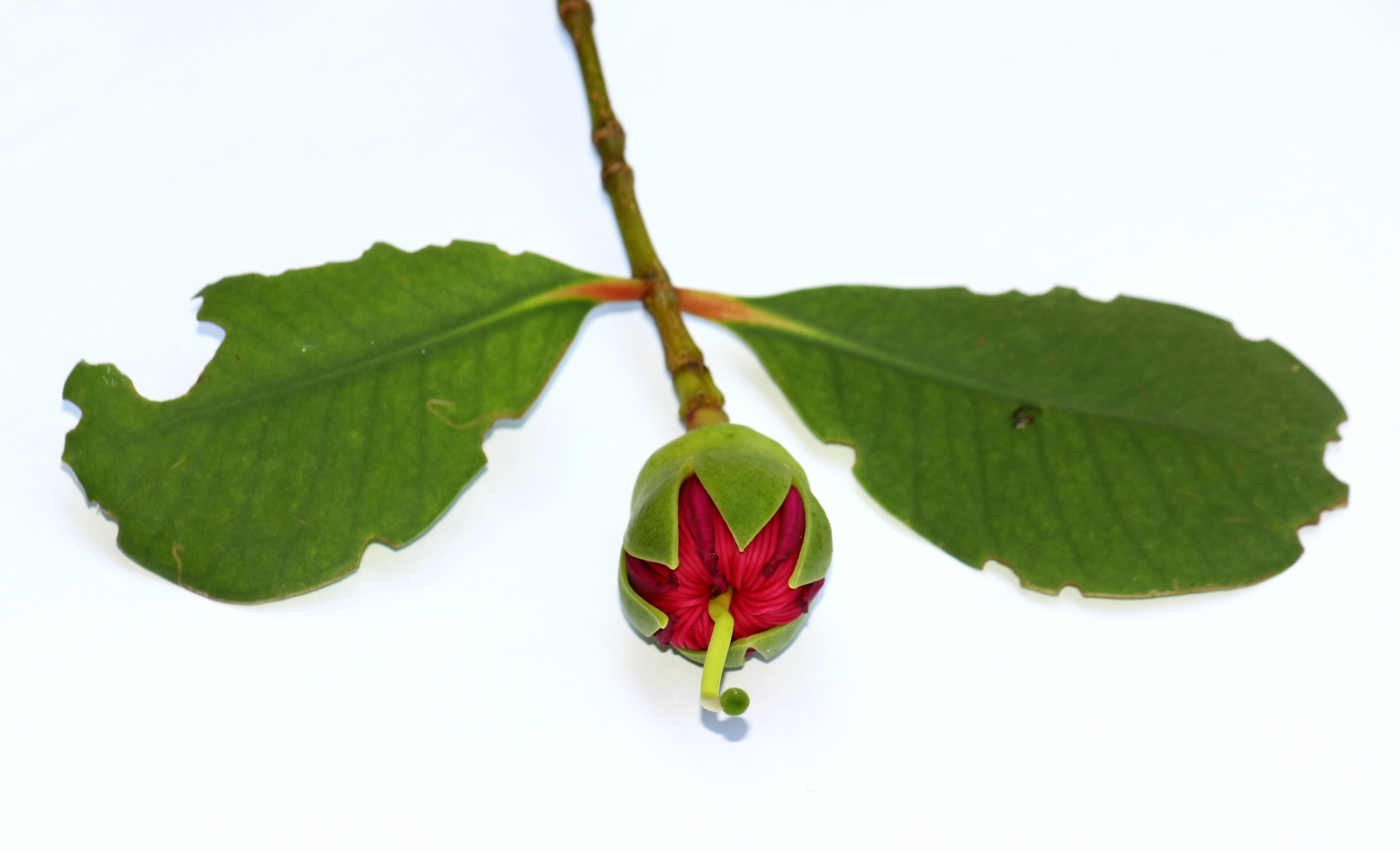
- Bud of mangrove apple

Conservation status
- Least Concern (IUCN 3.1)

Scientific classification
- Kingdom: Plantae
- Clade: Tracheophytes
- Clade: Angiosperms
- Clade: Eudicots
- Clade: Rosids
- Order: Myrtales
- Family: Lythraceae
- Genus: Sonneratia
- Species: S. caseolaris

Binomial name
- Sonneratia caseolaris (L.) Engl.

Synonyms
- List: Aubletia caseolaris (L.) Gaertn.; Blatti caseolaris (L.) Kuntze; Sonneratia acida L.f.; Sonneratia evenia Blume; Sonneratia neglecta Blume; Sonneratia obovata Blume; Sonneratia ovalis Korth.; Sonneratia rubra Oken; Rhizophora caseolaris L.

= Sonneratia caseolaris =

Species of fruit and plant

Sonneratia caseolaris, commonly known as mangrove apple, or pagatpat is a species of plant in the family Lythraceae. The fruit is noted for its outward similarity to the persimmon fruit.

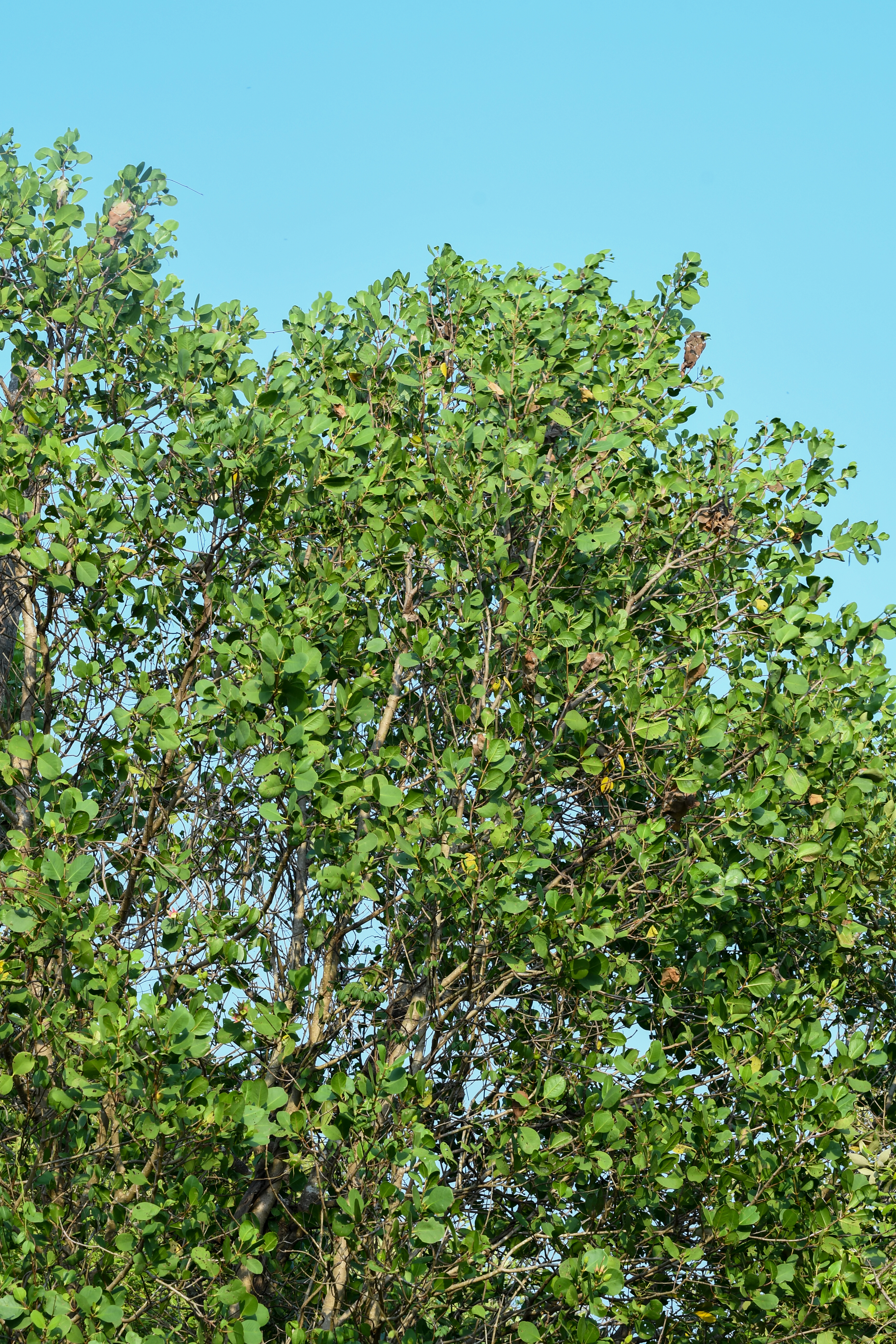
Sonneratia caseolaris in Kerala

This tree is a type of mangrove growing up to 20 m in height and with a trunk reaching a maximum diameter of 50 cm. It is present in tropical tidal mud flats from Africa to Indonesia, southwards down to northeast Australia and New Caledonia and northwards up to Hainan Island in China and the Philippines. It has pneumatophores or "knees" up to 2 m (6 ft 7 in) in height and conical in form

The fruit of this tree is the subject of a legend of Maldivian folklore, Kulhlhavah Falu Rani. Kuhlhavah (ކުއްޅަވައް) is the Dhivehi name for the mangrove apple (Sonneratia caseolaris).

The tree is associated with congregating fireflies throughout southeast Asia and is the food source of moth and other insects.

== Uses ==
The leaves and the fruit are edible and appreciated as food in certain areas, such as Maldives. In Sri Lanka, where the fruit is known as kirala gédi (කිරල ගෙඩි) in Sinhala or Kārk koṭṭaikaḷ (கார்க் கொட்டைகள்) in Tamil, the pulp of the fruit is mixed with coconut milk extract and made into a milk shake. Many tourist resorts situated in the South of Sri Lanka where the trees grow abundantly alongside rivers, offer fresh fruit drinks made from the fruit. In the Maldives the fruits are used as a refreshing drink and also eaten with scraped coconut & sugar.

The tree is also sometimes known as cork tree, because fishermen in some areas make fishing net floats by shaping the pneumatophores into small floats.
