= Xanthonoid =

Class of phenolic chemical compounds

Mangiferin, a xanthonoid found in mangoes

A xanthonoid is a chemical natural phenolic compound formed from the xanthone backbone. Many members of the Clusiaceae contain xanthonoids.

Xanthonoid biosynthesis in cell cultures of Hypericum androsaemum involves the presence of a benzophenone synthase condensing a molecule of benzoyl-CoA with three malonyl-CoA yielding to 2,4,6-trihydroxybenzophenone. This intermediate is subsequently converted by a benzophenone 3′-hydroxylase, a cytochrome P450 monooxygenase, leading to the formation of 2,3′,4,6-tetrahydroxybenzophenone.

Some examples are tomentonone, zeyloxanthonone and calozeyloxanthone isolated from the bark of Calophyllum tomentosum, apetalinone A, B, C and D from Calophyllum apetalum, gaudichaudione A, B, C, D, E, F, G, H, gaudichaudiic acid A, B, C, D, E, morellic acid and forbesione from Garcinia gaudichaudii, methylswertianin and bellidifolin from Swertia punicea or psorospermin obtained from Psorospermum febrifugum. Cassiaxanthone can be found in Cassia reticulata.

Cytotoxic xanthones (gambogin, morellin dimethyl acetal, isomoreollin B, moreollic acid, gambogenic acid, gambogenin, isogambogenin, desoxygambogenin, gambogenin dimethyl acetal, gambogellic acid, gambogic acid, isomorellin, morellic acid, desoxymorellin and hanburin) can be isolated from the dry latex of Garcinia hanburyi (gamboge tree).
