= List of Hypericum sect. Adenosepalum species =

The section Adenosepalum of genus Hypericum contains thirty species and two hybrids, as well as five recognized subspecies, in four subsections. The section was described by French botanist Édouard Spach and its type species is Hypericum montanum. Species in Adenosepalum are found in Europe, Russia, the Caucasus, and Morocco. They are shrubs, shrublets, and herbs that grow to be 2.5 meters in height with glabrous or simple hairs, black glands on their leaves, which are placed opposite or are 3-whorled.

== Species ==
Subsection or hybrid	Binomial and common name	Author	Yr	Type	Habitat	Distribution	Map	Image	Ref
Adenosepalum	H. annulatum	Moris	1827	Perennial herb		Balkans, Saudi Arabia, East Africa			
Adenosepalum	H. annulatum subsp. afromontanum	(Bullock) N.Robson		Perennial herb		Ethiopia, Kenya, Tanzania, Uganda			
Adenosepalum	H. annulatum subsp. annulatum			Perennial herb		Bosnia & Herzegovina, Italy, Balkans, Switzerland			
Adenosepalum	H. annulatum subsp. intermedium	(Steud. ex A.Rich.) N.Robson		Perennial herb		Northeast Africa, Arabian Peninsula			
Adenosepalum	H. athoum	Boiss. & Orph.	1867	Perennial herb	Rock crevices, rocky places in shade	Greece			
Adenosepalum	H. atomarium	Boiss.	1827	Perennial herb	Stony places near streams, damp shade	Greece, Turkey, Portugal (Naturalized)			
Adenosepalum	H. cuisinii	Barbey	1885	Perennial herb	Near springs, calcareous rock fissures	Greece, Turkey			
Adenosepalum	H. delphicum	Boiss. & Heldr.	1854	Perennial herb	Damp & shady areas around rocks	Greece			
Adenosepalum	H. lanuginosum (Downy St. John's Wort)	Lam.	1797	Perennial herb	Damp & shady areas around rocks	Middle East, Turkey, Cyprus			
Adenosepalum	H. montanum (Pale St. John's Wort)	L.	1755	Perennial herb	Woods, thickets, gravelly soils	Eurasia, Morocco		Flowers July–August	
Adenosepalum	H. reflexum	L.f.	1782	Shrub	Damp cliffs & walls, around springs & rocky streams	Canary Islands			
Aethiopica	H. abilianum	N.Robson	1980	Subshrub	Among grass and low shrubs	Angola			
Aethiopica	H. aethiopicum	Thunb.	1800	Perennial herb	Open grasslands, seasonal swamps, bare areas	Southern Africa			
Aethiopica	H. aethiopicum subsp. aethiopicum								
Aethiopica	H. aethiopicum subsp. sonderi	(Bredell) N.Robson							
Aethiopica	H. afrum	Lam.	1797	Perennial herb	Marshes, streamsides, damp moors	Tunisia, Algeria			
Aethiopica	H. conjungens	N.Robson	1958	Shrub/subshrub		Central Africa			
Aethiopica	H. glandulosum (Malfurada del Monte)	Aiton	1789	Shrub		Canary Islands, Madeira			
Aethiopica	H. kiboënse	Oliv.	1887	Shrub/Subshrub		Uganda, Kenya, Tanzania			
Caprifolia	H. caprifolium	Boiss.	1838	Perennial herb		Western Spain			
Caprifolia	H. coadunatum	Chr. Sm.	1825	Subshrub/Perennial herb		Canary Islands			
Caprifolia	H. collenetteae	N.Robson	1993	Subshrub/Perennial herb		Saudi Arabia			
Caprifolia	H. naudinianum	Coss. & Durieu	1855	Perennial herb	Near streamsides & waterfalls	Morocco, Algeria			
Caprifolia	H. psilophytum	(Diels) Maire	1935	Perennial herb		Morocco, Algeria			
Caprifolia	H. pubescens	Boiss.	1838	Perennial herb		Southern Iberia, North Africa			
Caprifolia	H. scruglii	Bacch., Brullo & Salmeri	2010	Perennial herb		Sardinia			
Caprifolia	H. sinaicum	Hochst. ex Boiss.	1867	Perennial herb		Egypt, Arabian Peninsula			
Caprifolia	H. somaliense	N.Robson	1958	Perennial herb		Somalia			
Caprifolia	H. tomentosum	L.	1753	Perennial herb		Western Mediterranean			
Huber-Morathii	H. decaisneanum	Coss. & Daveau	1889	Perennial herb		Western Libya			
Huber-Morathii	H. formosissimum	Takht.	1940	Perennial herb	Among limestone rocks	Armenia, Azerbaijan, Turkey			
Huber-Morathii	H. huber-morathii	N.Robson	1967	Perennial herb	Among limestone rocks	Southwest Turkey			
Huber-Morathii	H. minutum	P.H.Davis & Poulter	1954	Perennial herb		Southwest Turkey			
Huber-Morathii	H. sechmenii	Ocak & O.Koyuncu	2009	Perennial herb	Among limestone rocks	Central Turkey	Two localities in Gunyuzu, Turkey		
Hybrid	H. × joerstadii (H. glandulosum × H. reflexum)	Lid	1968	Intermediate Shrub		Canary Islands			
Hybrid	H. pubescens × tomentosum					Morocco, Western Spain			
