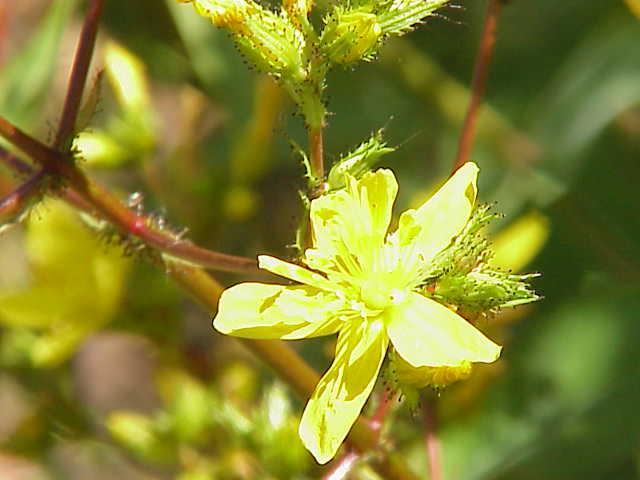

Scientific classification
- Kingdom: Plantae
- Clade: Tracheophytes
- Clade: Angiosperms
- Clade: Eudicots
- Clade: Rosids
- Order: Malpighiales
- Family: Hypericaceae
- Genus: Hypericum
- Section: Hypericum sect. Adenosepalum
- Species: H. tomentosum

Binomial name
- Hypericum tomentosum L.

= Hypericum tomentosum =

Species of flowering plant of the St. John's wort family

Hypericum tomentosum is a species of flowering plant of the St. John's wort family (Hypericaceae) that is found in the western Mediterranean.

== Taxonomy ==
The placement of H. tomentosum within Hypericum can be summarized as follows:

Hypericum

Hypericum subg. Hypericum

Hypericum sect. Adenosepalum

subsect. Adenosepalum
subsect. Aethiopica
Huber-Morathii group
subsect. Caprifolia

H. caprifolium
H. coadunatum
H. collenetteae
H. naudinianum
H. psilophytum
H. pubescens
H. scruglii
H. sinaicum
H. somaliense
H. tomentosum
