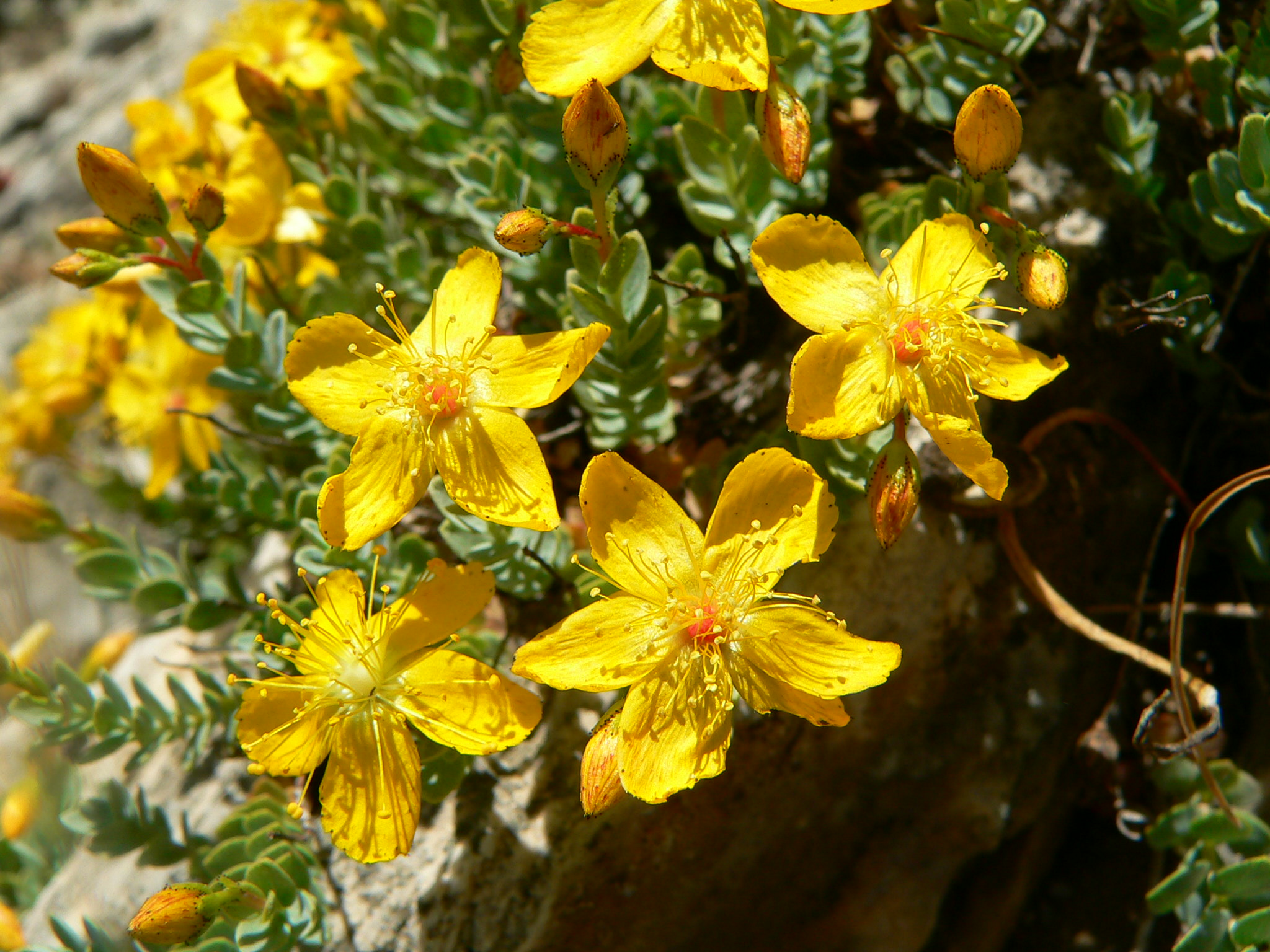

Scientific classification
- Kingdom: Plantae
- Clade: Tracheophytes
- Clade: Angiosperms
- Clade: Eudicots
- Clade: Rosids
- Order: Malpighiales
- Family: Hypericaceae
- Genus: Hypericum
- Section: Hypericum sect. Adenosepalum
- Species: H. sechmenii

Binomial name
- Hypericum sechmenii Ocak & O.Koyuncu
- Approximate distribution of Hypericum sechmenii within Turkey

= Hypericum sechmenii =

Flowering plant of the St John's wort family

Hypericum sechmenii, Ocak & O.Koyuncu (Seçmen's St John's wort), is a rare species of flowering plant of the St John's wort family that is found in Eskişehir Province in central Turkey. It was first described and assigned to the genus Hypericum L. in 2009, and was later placed into the section AdenosepalumSpach. Hypericum sechmenii is a perennial herb that usually grows 3 to 6 centimeters (1 to 2 inches) tall and blooms in June and July. The stems of the plant are smooth and hairless, while the leaves are leathery and lack leafstalks. Its flowers are arranged in corymbs, and each has five bright yellow petals. Similar species are H. huber-morathiiRobson, H. minutumDavis & Poulter, and H. thymopsisBoiss.

Found among limestone rocks, H. sechmenii has an estimated distribution of less than 10 square kilometers (4 square miles), with fewer than 250 surviving plants. Despite containing druse crystals and toxic chemicals may deter herbivory, the species is threatened by overgrazing, as well as by other factors like climate change and habitat loss.

== Description ==
Hypericum sechmenii is a flowering perennial herb that grows in dense clusters of upright stems typically 3–6 cm (1–2 in) tall, sometimes up to 8 cm (3 in) tall. It has five-petalled yellow flowers that usually flower in June and July.

=== Vegetative structures ===
The outside of the plant's roots is made of a thick cuticle, a protective waterproof covering made of fats and wax. Directly beneath the cuticle are one to two bark-like layers of periderm that are composed of several layers of dead cells. Beneath the periderm are several layers of thin-walled cells called a cortex. The tissue of the roots is completely covered in a layer of the water transport tissue found in plants called xylem.

The numerous smooth and hairless stems of Hypericum sechmenii have multiple layers of different kinds of cells. On the outside is a thin cuticle that covers a single layer of epidermis. Beneath this epidermis, there are several layers of oblong peridermal cells. These contain a waxy substance called suberin that is hydrophobic. Some cells in the periderm of the stems also contain inorganic minerals known as druse crystals, which a 2020 paper theorized might deter herbivory because of their toxicity. Beneath the periderm is the main growth tissue, the vascular cambium, which produces xylem and the transport tissue found in plants called phloem.

The leaves of Hypericum sechmenii lack petioles (leafstalks), instead attaching directly to the stems. They are roughly 0.2–0.5 cm (0.08–0.2 in) long, and densely overlap each other. The texture of the leaves is described as subcoriaceous, or somewhat leathery. The shape of the leaves is either egg-like (ovate) with a broader base, or elliptic with rounded tips and pointed bases (cuneate). There are numerous pale glands on the surfaces of the leaves, and a few black glands can be found on their edges. The black glands are large enough to be seen by the naked eye, but to see the pale glands the leaf may need to be held up to a light. In the type species of the genus, H. perforatum, the pale glands contain and excrete essential oils, while the black glands contain red-staining phenolic compounds (anthraquinone derivatives) that deter some herbivorous insects. On the top and bottom sides of the leaves there are pores (stomata) that regulate gas exchange, and there is tightly packed photosynthetic tissue just below the epidermis. Some of the cells in this tissue also contain druse crystals.

=== Flowering structures ===
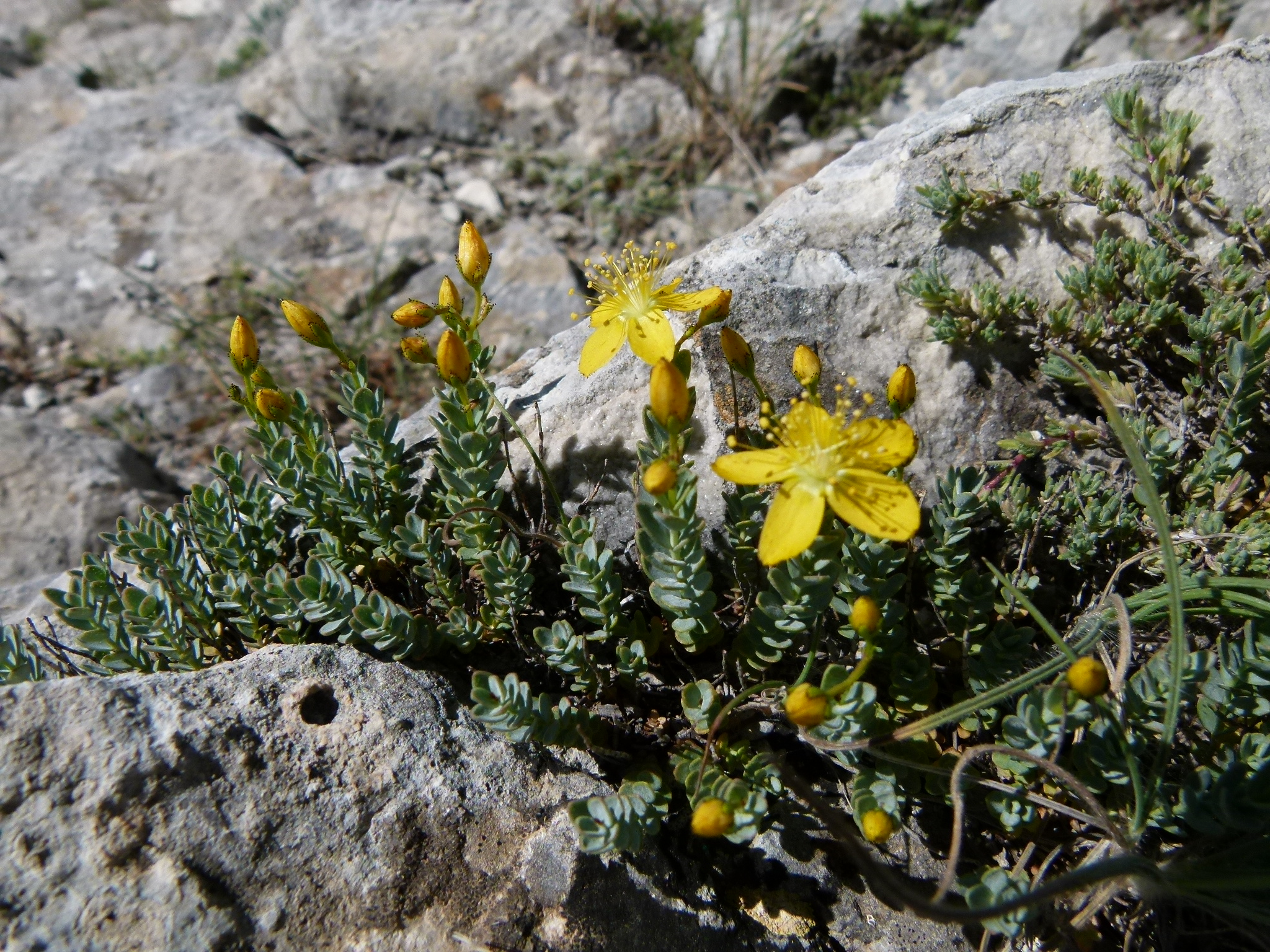
Hypericum sechmenii plant beginning to bloom

Hypericum sechmenii usually flowers from June to July, and it fruits in July. The flower clusters known as inflorescences grow on the ends of the stems and typically have three to five flowers each. The flowers are arranged such that there are longer flower stems (pedicels) on the outer flowers than on the inner ones. This gives the cluster a flat top and forms a structure called a corymb. The specialized bract leaves, which surround the flowers, are long and have glands and small hairs called cilia. The leafy structures that provide support for the petals, called the sepals, are roughly 0.2 cm (0.08 in) long, are an oblong shape, and can either be pointed or rounded. Their edges also have glands and small hairs, similar to the bracts. However, they may also have amber-colored dots and lines, which the bracts lack. The petals are yellow, like the type species of Hypericum, and grow in a pentagonal arrangement on each flower. They are 0.4–0.7 cm (0.2–0.3 in) long and have amber-colored glands that are shaped like dots or short lines. On the edges of the petals there are a few black glands in addition to the amber-colored ones.

The pollen grains of Hypericum sechmenii have three grooves in a triangular layout, and the overall shape of the grain is a slightly elongated sphere. An individual grain is 17.2 micrometers (μm) long and 11.5 μm wide. Each surface groove is 12.2 μm long and 2.4 μm wide, and the space where the grooves meet is 1.7 μm in diameter. There are pores on the surface of the pollen that are 2.5 μm long and 2.2 μm wide. Surrounding the grain is a tough outer wall that is 1.5 μm thick and has an outer layer with a net-like pattern.

The seed capsules are 0.3–0.4 cm (0.12–0.16 in) and oblong, and their ovaries have a few oil cavities that run lengthwise along the capsule. The seeds themselves have tiny, regularly spaced pits that form patterns similar in appearance to small lines or ladders.

=== Similar species ===
Hypericum sechmenii is similar in appearance to other Turkish species of Hypericum. In its original description, its similarity to Hypericum huber-morathii and Hypericum minutum was noted, and it has also been compared to Hypericum thymopsis.

When compared to Hypericum minutum and H. huber-morathii, H. sechmenii has differences in its leaves, flowers, and pollen grains. Its leaves are adjacent to one another on the stem and overlap, while the leaves of H. minutum and H. huber-morathii are placed on opposite sides of the stem and do not. H. sechmenii has more flowers on an inflorescence (3–5) than H. minutum (1–3), but usually has fewer than H. huber-morathii (3–12). The glands on its petals are also different; H. sechmenii has amber-colored dots and lines, whereas H. minutum has amber-colored dots with no lines and H. huber-morathii only has black dots or no visible glands at all. Pollen grains are another way to tell the three species apart. H. minutum has tiny protrusions on the surface of its pollen called microspinae, which H. sechmenii lacks, and H. minutum also has far fewer distinct grooves on its surface. H. sechmenii pollen grains are larger than those of H. minutum and smaller than those of H. huber-morathii. H. huber-morathii has a slightly larger region on the end of the grain where the grooves meet.

Anatomically, Hypericum sechmenii is also similar to H. thymopsis despite not being as closely related. Both species have similar stomata that make them able to thrive in dry climates, and both have stomata on the upper and lower sides of their leaves. However, the structure of the species' stem tissue sets them apart. H. sechmenii has a thinner layer of palisade tissue and its inner stem region is made up solely of xylem, whereas H. thymopsis has softer, spongy pith tissue as well.

== Taxonomy ==
Hypericum sechmenii was first observed and collected by the Turkish botanist Atila Ocak in 2006. The holotype of the species was collected in that same year by Ocak in the district of Günyüzü and is now deposited at Eskişehir Osmangazi University. Three years later, in December 2009, the species was formally described by Ocak and Onur Koyuncu in the journal Annales Botanici Fennici. The authors gave the species the specific epithet sechmenii as an homage to the prominent Turkish taxonomist and ecologist Özcan Seçmen. In Turkish, the plant is called seçmen kantaronu, translated as Seçmen's St John's wort. The species was incorporated into the Flora of Turkey endemic species registry in 2011 alongside another recently described Hypericum species, Hypericum musadoganii.

In 1977, the British taxonomist Norman Robson began a monograph about the genus Hypericum. He divided the genus into 36 sections, with almost every species in the genus placed into one of these sections based on their morphology and early applications of molecular phylogenetics. However, Hypericum sechmenii was not included in this original monograph, as it had not yet been identified as a unique species. Robson later corroborated the findings of Ocak and Koyuncu that H. sechmenii was its species, taking note of its similarities to other Anatolian species of Hypericum, specifically Hypericum minutum and Hypericum huber-morathii. Because of this, Robson placed the species in a clade called the Huber-Morathii Group. The group comprises five Turkish species of Hypericum and lies within the large section Adenosepalum. The placement of H. sechmenii was summarized by Robson as follows:

Hypericum

Hypericum subg. Hypericum

Hypericum sect. Adenosepalum

Huber-morathii group

H. decaisneanum – H. formosissimum – H. huber-morathii – H. minutum – H. sechmenii

== Distribution and habitat ==
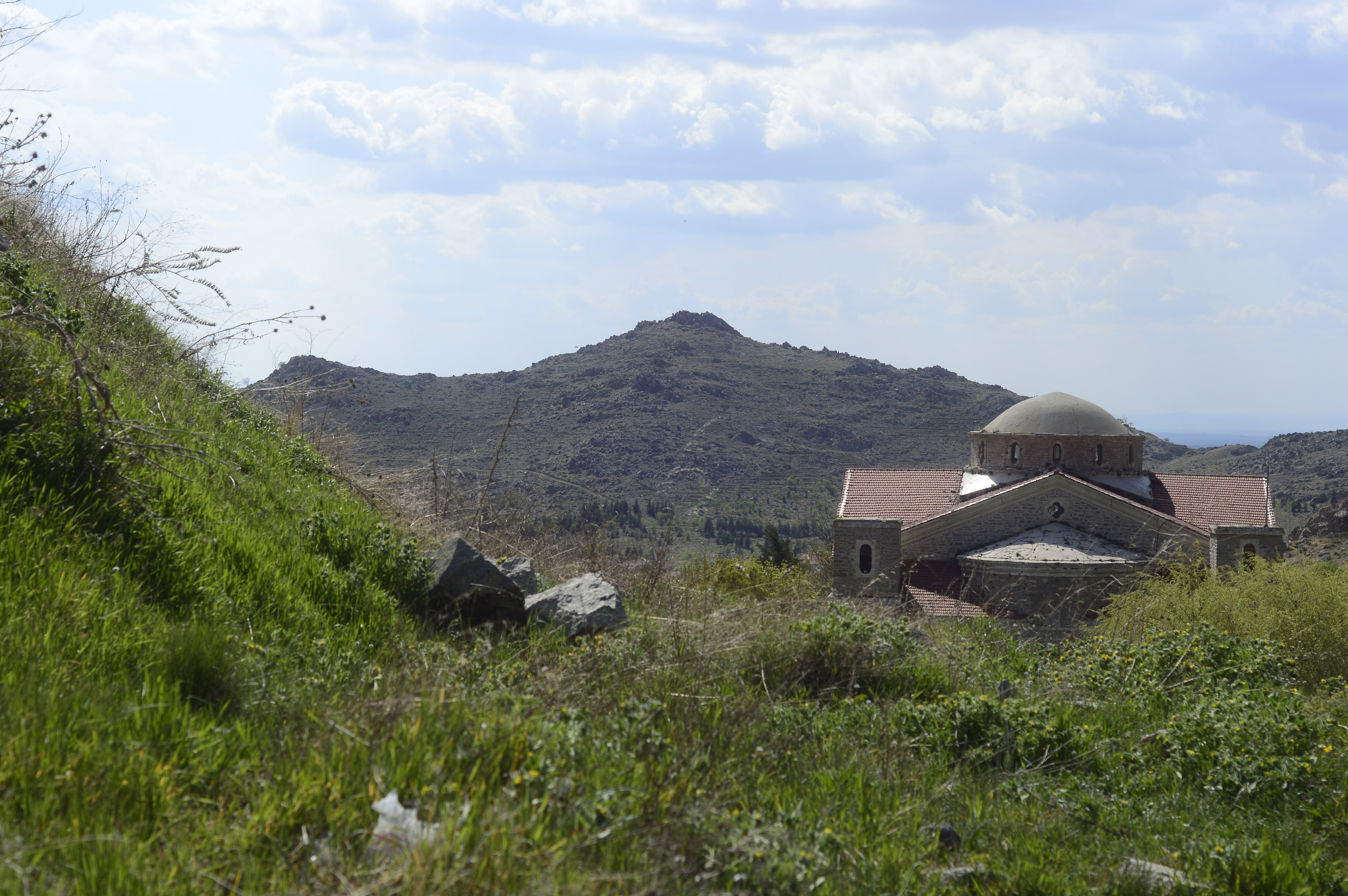
Rocky hills near Kaymaz like these are the habitat of Hypericum sechmenii.

Hypericum sechmenii is one of around 45 species of Hypericum that are endemic to Turkey. Specifically, the species has been found in central Turkey within Eskişehir Province, at two separate localities: one near the peak of Arayit Mountain, and the other between the towns of Kaymaz and Sivrihisar. The area of distribution on Arayit Mountain is estimated to be 2 km^{2} (0.8 mi^{2}). The area of the Kaymaz to Sivrihisar locality is estimated to be smaller.

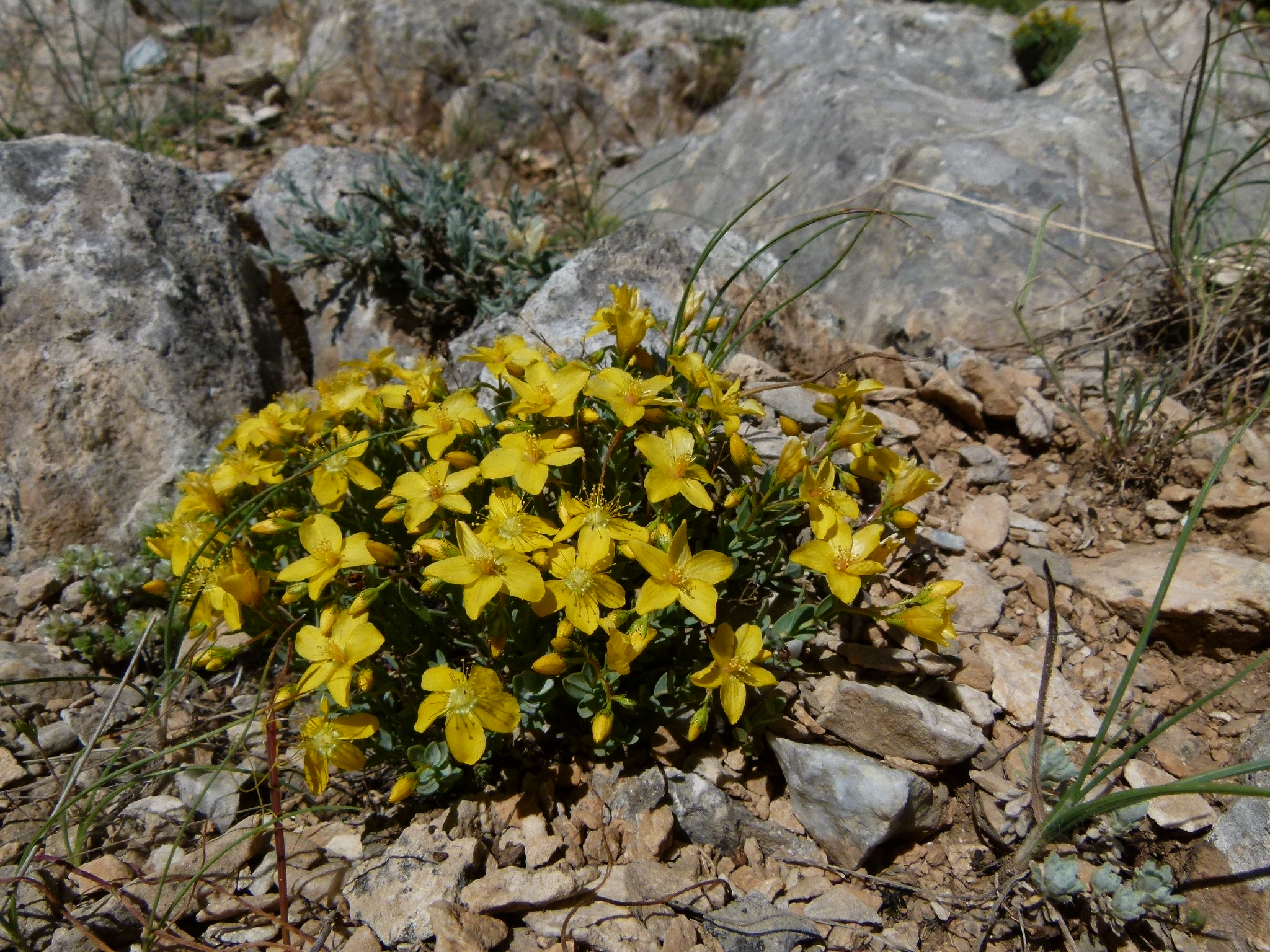
Hypericum sechmenii is found among limestone rocks.

The species' habitat is usually in and among the crevices of limestone rocks and outcroppings. The general elevation of the species is 1,750–1,820 m (5,740–5,970 ft). Several other specimens of Hypericum sechmenii have been collected since the species' discovery and are preserved at various Turkish herbaria.

Table of collected specimens of Hypericum sechmenii
| Type | District | Locality | Habitat | Collection Date | Herbarium | Reference |
|---|---|---|---|---|---|---|
| Holotype | Günyüzü | Arayit Mountain | Rock crevices | 10 June 2006 | Eskişehir Osmangazi University | |
| Isotype (Note: An isotype is a duplicate collection of the holotype.) | Günyüzü | Arayit Mountain | Rock crevices | 10 June 2006 | Gazi University | |
| Isotype | Günyüzü | Arayit Mountain | Rock crevices | 10 June 2006 | Hacettepe University | |
| | Sivrihisar | Arayit Mountain | Hilly steppe | 7 July 2011 | | |
| | Sivrihisar | Sivrihisar–Kaymaz | Rocks near Kaymaz | 13 July 2011 | | |

== Ecology ==
The leaves of Hypericum sechmenii contain xeromorphic stomata, pores that have adaptations to allow the plant to better survive in its arid, steppe habitat of Central Anatolia, defined as the Irano-Turanian floristic region. H. sechmenii has two adaptations of the genus Hypericum that deter grazing. The first is the presence of numerous black glands on the leaf margins; in other species of Hypericum, similar contain compounds that are toxic to creatures consuming the plant. The second is the presence of druse crystals in cells of the stem and leaf tissue. These contain minerals that are thought to deter some insects from grazing.

Hypericum sechmenii grows alongside small shrubs and perennial herbs like stonecress (Aethionema subulatum), woodruff (Asperula nitida), harebell (Asyneuma compactum), small toadflax (Chaenorhinium minus), Kotschy's damask flower (Hesperis kotschyi), flax (Linum cariense), restharrow (Ononis adenotricha), dandelions (Scorzonera tomentosa), Turkish catchfly (Silene falcata), and wood betony (Stachys lavandulifolia). It is found among only one other Hypericum species, that being Hypericum confertum.

Propagation of Hypericum sechmenii is undertaken by planting seeds in the spring, barely covering them in soil. They are then allowed to germinate for 1–3 months at a temperature of 10–16 °C (50–61 °F). The plants grow best in sunny, dry rock crevices with protection from winter dampness. The division is done in the spring, while cuttings are taken in the late summer.

== Conservation ==
The species is rare, with an estimated 250 surviving plants of the species in an area assumed to be smaller than 10 km^{2} (4 mi^{2}). The species is under threat from both abiotic factors, especially climate change, as well as human impact from agriculture and the grazing of domesticated animals. Because of these threats and the unsustainably small population size of Hypericum sechmenii, biologists from the Eskişehir Osmangazi University recommended that the species be classified as Critically Endangered by the International Union for Conservation of Nature, although no conservational measures had been taken as of 2013. As of 2025, no further information on the conservation of H. sechmenii has been published.

== Bibliography ==
- Carine, Mark A.; Christenhusz, Maarten J.M. (14 May 2013). "About this volume: the monograph of Hypericum by Norman Robson". Phytotaxa. 4 (1): 1–4. Bibcode:2013Phytx...4....1C. doi:10.11646/phytotaxa.4.1.1. hdl:10138/28047. ISSN 1179-3163. Archived from the original on 24 October 2023.
- Crockett, Sara; Robson, Norman (January 2011). "Taxonomy and chemotaxonomy of the genus Hypericum". Medicinal and Aromatic Plant Science and Biotechnology. 5 (Special Issue 1). Takamatsu, Japan: Global Science Books: 1–13. ISSN 1752-3389. PMC 3364714. PMID 22662019.
- Cuéllar-Cruz, Mayra; Pérez, Karina; Mendoza, María; Morena, Abel (2020). "Biocrystals in plants: a short review on biomineralization processes and the role of phototropin in the uptake of calcium". Crystals. 10 (7): 591. Bibcode:2020Cryst..10..591C. doi:10.3390/cryst10070591.
- Kaynak, Gönül (2012). Bursa Ve Çevresinde Yaylişi Olan Hypericum L. Taksonlari Üzerinde Taksonomik Ve Korolojik Araştirmalar [Taxonomic and Chorological Studies on Hypericum L. Taxa Distributed in Bursa and its Surroundings.] (PDF) (in Turkish). Uludağ University Institute of Science. Archived (PDF) from the original on 14 October 2023.
- "Climate of Turkey" (PDF). Meteoroloji Genel Müdürlüğü (General Directorate of Meteorology). Archived from the original (PDF) on 13 February 2015.
- Ocak, Atila; Savaroglu, Filiz; Potoğlu Erkara, İsmuhan; Koyuncu, Onur (2009). "Hypericum sechmenii (Hypericaceae), a new species from Central Anatolia, Turkey" (PDF). Annales Botanici Fennici. 46 (6): 591–594. Bibcode:2009AnnBF..46..591O. doi:10.5735/085.046.0616. ISSN 0003-3847. S2CID 86751774. Archived (PDF) from the original on 4 February 2021 – via www.sekj.org.
- Talebi, Khosro Sagheb; Sajedi, Toktam; Pourhashemi, Mehdi (22 October 2013). Forests of Iran: A Treasure from the Past, a Hope for the Future. Springer Science & Business Media. p. 66. ISBN 9789400773714.
- Tarihi, Geliş; Tarihi, Kabul; Tarihi, Yayın (2019). "The Studies on the endemic Hypericum Species from Turkey". Batman University Journal of Life Sciences. 9 (2). Archived from the original on 14 October 2022.
- Tekin, Mehmet (April 2017). "Pharmacobotanical study of Hypericum thymopsis". Revista Brasileira de Farmacognosia. 27 (2): 143–152. doi:10.1016/j.bjp.2016.09.004.
- Yaylaci, Ömer; Özgisi, Kurtulus; Sezer, Okan; Orhanoğlu, Gökhan; Öztürk, Derviş; Koyuncu, Onur (2013). "Anatomical studies and conservation status of rare endemic Hypericum sechmenii Ocak&Koyuncu (Sect: Adenosepalum) from Eskişehir – Turkey". Journal of Selçuk University Natural and Applied Science. 2 (1): 1–11. Archived from the original on 24 September 2018 – via ResearchGate.
