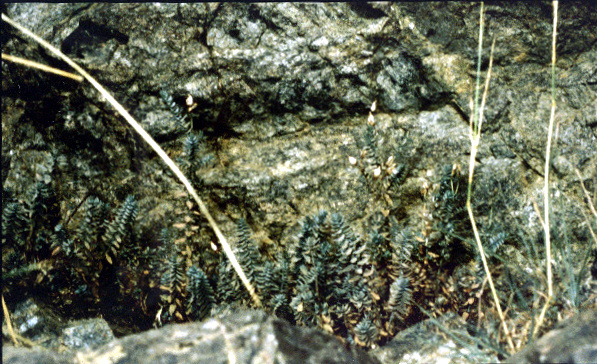

Scientific classification
- Kingdom: Plantae
- Clade: Embryophytes
- Clade: Tracheophytes
- Clade: Spermatophytes
- Clade: Angiosperms
- Clade: Eudicots
- Clade: Rosids
- Order: Malpighiales
- Family: Hypericaceae
- Genus: Hypericum
- Section: Hypericum sect. Adenosepalum
- Species: H. collenetteae

Binomial name
- Hypericum collenetteae N.Robson

= Hypericum collenetteae =

Species of flowering plant of the St. John's wort family

Hypericum collenetteae is a species of flowering plant of the St. John's wort family (Hypericaceae) that is found in Saudi Arabia.

== Taxonomy ==
Hypericum collenetteae was first described by Norman Robson in 1993. Robson spelt the specific epithet collenettiae. This is corrected to collenetteae in the International Plant Names Index entry. According to the International Code of Nomenclature for algae, fungi, and plants, Article 60.8, a connecting i is not used in epithets formed from personal names ending with a vowel. Iris Sheila Collenette is noted for her work on the botany of Saudi Arabia, and collected the holotype of this species.

The placement of H. collenetteae within Hypericum can be summarized as follows:

Hypericum

Hypericum sect. Adenosepalum

subsect. Caprifolia

H. caprifolium – H. coadunatum – H. collenetteae – H. naudinianum – H. psilophytum – H. pubescens – H. scruglii – H. sinaicum – H. somaliense – H. tomentosum
