= Formosissimum =

The word formosissimum is a specific epithet used in the name of various species. It derives from the superlative form of formosus, which means "beautiful" or "finely formed".

== Plants ==
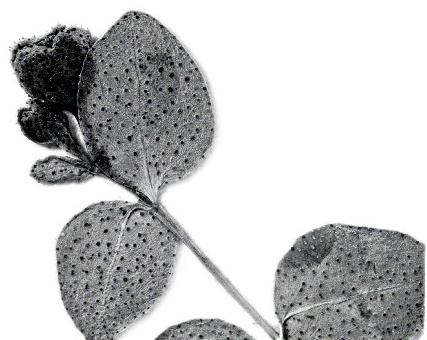
Hypericum formosissimum

The following list consists of flowering plant species names that include formosissimum. Species are included based on the Royal Botanic Garden Kew's Plants of the World Online.

Name		Family	Description			Status
Scientific	Common	Family	Author	Source	Year	Status
Hypericum formosissimum		Hypericaceae	Armen Takhtajan	Zametki po Sistematike i Geografii Rastenii	1940	Accepted

== Marine animals ==
The following list consists of marine animal species names that include formosissimum. Species are included based on the World Register of Marine Species.

Name		Family	Description			Status
Scientific	Common	Family	Author	Source	Year	Status
†Calliostoma formosissimum		Calliostomatidae	G. Seguenza	Bollettino del R. Comitato geologico d'Italia	1876	Accepted (fossil)
Columbarium formosissimum		Columbariidae	Tomlin	Annals of the South African Museum	1928	Accepted

== Other eukaryotes ==
The following list consists of other species names that include formosissimum.

Name		Family	Description			Status
Scientific	Common	Family	Author	Source	Year	Status
Pseudokephyrion formosissimum		Dinobryaceae	Conrad	Bull. Mus. royal d'Hist. Nat. Belg.	1938	Accepted
