= Sheila Collenette =

British botanist (1927–2017)

Iris Sheila Collenette (née Darnton) (26 August 1927 – 24 July 2017) was a British botanist, plant collector, and author.

== Life ==
Collenette was born 26th August 1927 at Cranbrook in Kent. She was the daughter of Old Etonian Rupert Edward Darnton DFC (born Rupert, Baron von Schunck in 1895) and Ornithologist Iris Dorie Moreton (1900 -1984), daughter of John Smith Moreton (1858-1948) and Julia Lucy (1864-1940) of Pickenham Hall, Norfolk which was situated in extensive botanical grounds. Julia was elder daughter of Swiss born Hans Gaspard Schintz (1837 - 1912), of Childwall Hall, Liverpool. Schintz, a merchant specialising in the extraction and marketing of Chilean nitrates. Collenette's uncle was composer Christian Darnton, born in 1905 and also known as Baron von Schunck. She married the geologist Peter Collenette in 1955.

Her husband took a job as chief geologist in Saudi Arabia and Collenette took the opportunity to visit the country and collect botanical specimens. She became noted for her work on the flora there, particularly her books An illustrated guide to the flowers of Saudi Arabia and Wildflowers of Saudi Arabia. The species Aloe sheilae and Rhytidocaulon sheilae and Echinops sheilae were named in her honour. She collected the holotype of Hypericum collenetteae, named by Norman Robson. She identified at least fourteen species. The standard author abbreviation Collen. is used to indicate this person as the author when citing a botanical name.

== Works ==
- Collenette, Sheila (1985). An illustrated guide to the flowers of Saudi Arabia. Scorpion. ISBN 9780905906454. OCLC 924681691.
- Collenette, Sheila (1999). Wildflowers of Saudi Arabia. NCWCD. OCLC 924045825.
- Collenette, Sheila (1998). A checklist of botanical species in Saudi Arabia. International Asclepiad Society. ISBN 9780953237609. OCLC 38854653.
