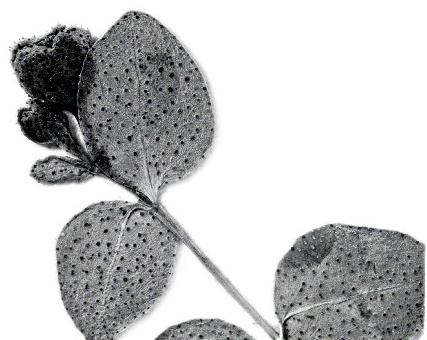

Scientific classification
- Kingdom: Plantae
- Clade: Embryophytes
- Clade: Tracheophytes
- Clade: Spermatophytes
- Clade: Angiosperms
- Clade: Eudicots
- Clade: Rosids
- Order: Malpighiales
- Family: Hypericaceae
- Genus: Hypericum
- Section: Hypericum sect. Adenosepalum
- Species: H. formosissimum

Binomial name
- Hypericum formosissimum Takht.

Synonyms
- Hypericum formosum Takht.

= Hypericum formosissimum =

Species of flowering plant in the St John's wort family

Hypericum formosissimum is a species of flowering plant in the St John's wort family Hypericaceae. Found in the cracks of limestone rocks, it is a small perennial herb that grows in a pillow-like shape, has yellow flower petals, and blooms in the late summer. The plant is rare and has a limited habitat in Turkey, Armenia, and Azerbaijan. It is threatened by rock collapses, urbanization, and road construction; it is not protected by conservation efforts.

The species was first described as Hypericum formosum by Soviet-Armenian botanist Armen Takhtajan and was later excluded from a genus-wide monograph of Hypericum by English botanist Norman Robson. When the species was reviewed by Robson, he was uncertain whether it belonged in section Origanifolia or section Adenosepalum. In a 2013 online publication, Robson placed the species in a Hypericum huber-morathii group within section Adenosepalum alongside several related species.

== Description ==
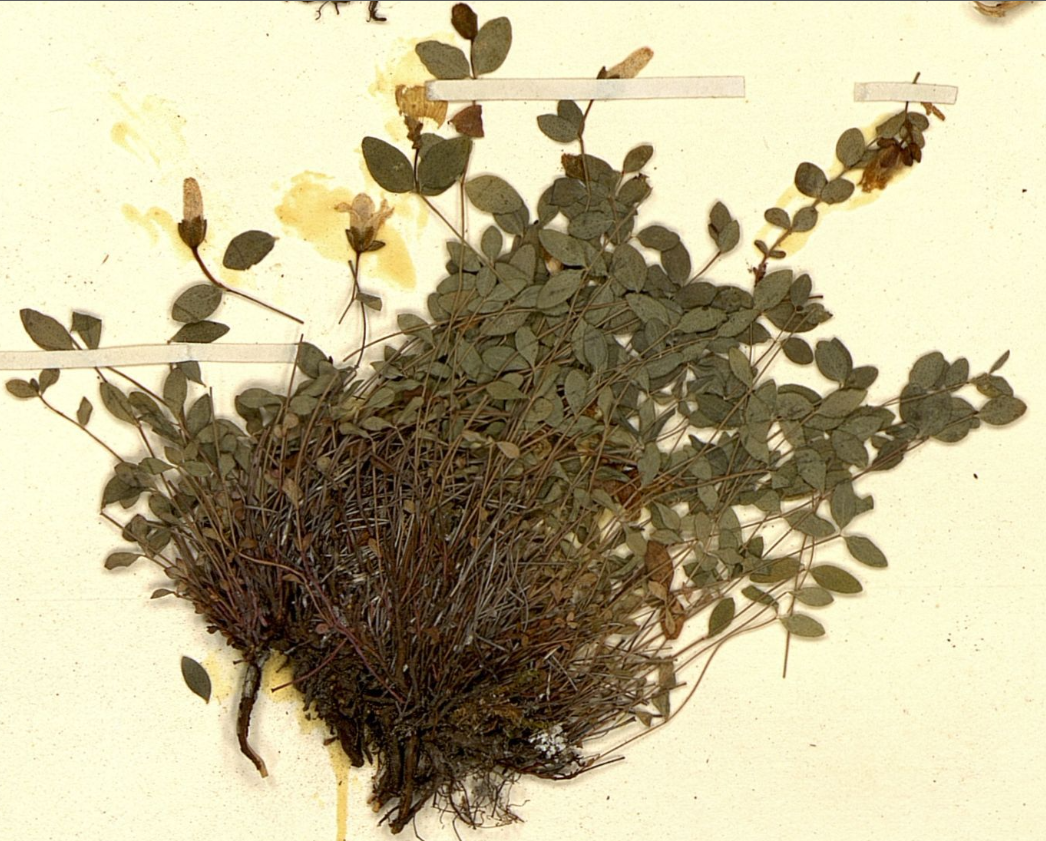
Foliage of a collected specimen of Hypericum formosissimum

Hypericum formosissimum is a perennial herb that grows 3–10 centimetres (1.2–3.9 inches) tall. It is a glabrous plant, meaning it lacks small hairs on its surfaces, and it grows in a pulviniform, or pillow-like, shape. The plant has many slender and brittle stems that grow in straggling directions. The leaves grow from nodes spaced 0.3–1.4 cm (0.12–0.55 in) from each other along the stems. The leaves are attached by a short petiole, or leaf stalk, that is 0.2–0.3 cm (0.079–0.118 in) long, and the laminae, or leaf blades, are 0.3–1.0 cm (0.12–0.39 in) long and 0.3–0.8 cm (0.12–0.31 in) wide with an almost leathery (subcoriaceous) texture. Each leaf has an apex, or tip, that is obtuse (rounded) and a base in the shape of a wide wedge (broadly cuneate) that sometimes can be truncate, meaning that the base can be completely squared off. The two obscure pairs of lateral veins branch out from the part of the midrib closest to the base of the leaf. There are black glands spaced out across the surface of the leaf.

Each inflorescence (flower cluster) has between one and five flowers from a single terminal node at the end of a stem. The buds are globose, or roughly spherical. The flowers are 1.0–1.2 cm (0.39–0.47 in) wide and have bracteoles (small bract-like structures) with black glands below them. The sepals are 0.2–0.25 cm (0.079–0.098 in) long and 0.1–0.15 cm (0.039–0.059 in) wide, with a single large vein and pale amber and black glands. Species in Hypericum have between 4 and 6 petals. The petals of H. formosissimum are pale yellow, 0.6–0.8 cm (0.24–0.31 in) long and 0.2–0.5 cm (0.079–0.197 in) wide, with a rounded tip and pale glands. The flowers have 18–20 stamens, the longest of which is around 0.5–0.6 cm (0.20–0.24 in) long. The styles are two to three times as long as than the ovary, and the seed capsule is around 0.3 cm (0.12 in) long with several partial vittae. The seeds are brown and measure 0.1–0.3 cm (0.039–0.118 in), and have small linear pits on their surface. Hypericum formosissimum flowers in June and July and fruits from July to August.

=== Chemistry ===
Unlike most species in the genus Hypericum, H. formosissimum does not contain both hypericin and pseudohypericin in its chemical profile. It contains only pseudohypericin, which is present at similar levels to other related species like H. annulatum and H. montanum. The species does possess slight traces of mangiferin and moderate traces of isomangiferin.

== Etymology ==
One origin of the genus name Hypericum is that it is derived from the Greek words hyper (above) and eikon (picture), in reference to the tradition of hanging the plant over religious icons in the home. The specific epithet formosissimum derives from the superlative form of formosus, which means "beautiful" or "finely formed". In Turkish, the species is known as bitlis kantaronu, sharing a name with the Anatolian city and province of Bitlis.

== Taxonomy ==
The species was first described in 1937 as Hypericum formosum by Soviet-Armenian botanist Armen Takhtajan in the botanical series of the Soviet academic journal Izvestiia Akademii Nauk SSSR. This name was illegitimate, because German botanist Carl Sigismund Kunth had already validly published the accepted species Hypericum formosum in 1822. In 1940, Takhtajan corrected his illegitimate name in a publication in Zametki po Sistematike i Geografii Rastenii, creating the new combination Hypericum formosissimum.

Hypericum formosissimum was originally excluded from a comprehensive monograph of the genus Hypericum by English botanist Norman Robson, along with the related species H. huber-morathii and H. minutum. The species was later addressed by Robson in 1993 and 1996. In 1993, he acknowledged that the species should be treated as part of sect. Adenosepalum. However, he also stated that removing H. formosissimum, the aforementioned related species, and several other species related to Hypericum elodeoides would lead to a "purified" sect. Adenosepalum forming a "natural group" of species. In 1996, he then advocated for their inclusion in sect. Origanifolia based on the structure of their vittae which would relate them most closely to Hypericum aviculariifolium in the latter section.

In an online edition of the monograph published in 2013, the species was included by Norman Robson and his colleague David Pattinson within a "Huber-morathii group" inside sect. Adenosepalum. There, it was proposed that H. formosissimum was an "extreme development" of sect. Adenosepalum because of its pillow-shaped growth pattern and almost threadlike stems. In the online classification, the placement of Hypericum formosissimum was summarized as follows:

Hypericum

Hypericum sect. Adenosepalum

Huber-morathii group

H. decaisneanum – H. formosissimum – H. huber-morathii – H. minutum – H. sechmenii

== Distribution and habitat ==
In Turkey, Hypericum formosissimum is only found in the Yukarı Murat-Van region of eastern Anatolia. It also grows in Armenia and the Nakhchivan exclave of Azerbaijan. Across its distribution, the species can be found in the cracks between limestone rocks at elevations of 1,500–1,900 metres (4,900–6,200 feet).

== Ecology ==
Hypericum formosissimum is a part of the Atropatenian Subprovince in the Irano-Turanian floristic region, an area characterized by high numbers of endemic species. The species has been noted to be a part of a plant community centered around the flowering plant Eremurus spectabilis. It can be found alongside species like Melilotus officinalis (yellow melilot), Lotus corniculatus (bird's-foot trefoil), and Campanula glomerata (clustered bellflower). (Note: Other species in the association include Astragalus_prilipkoanus, Hordeum_bulbosum, Cynodon_dactylon, Phleum_phleoides, Stipa_hohenackeriana, Diphelypaea_tournefortii, Althaea hirsuta, Verbascum_pyramidatum, and Valeriana_tiliifolia.)

When the plant is cultivated, it is grown in sunny and dry areas with protection from winter dampness. It can be grown in poor, well-drained soil. Propagation is undertaken by seeding in springtime; the seed is covered with a small amount of soil and left to germinate for 1–3 months. Division is done in the spring while cuttings are taken in the late summer.

== Conservation ==
The village of Areni, where conservation for Hypericum formosissimum has been proposed

Hypericum formosissimum was listed in the Red Data Book of Armenia as a Rare species, but it was not included in the CITES treaty or the Berne Convention. It has a limited distribution of less than 500 square kilometres (190 sq mi) with only three localities in Armenia, one in Azerbaijan, and one in Turkey. It is threatened by natural factors like collapsing rocks, as well as human factors like urbanization and road construction. As of 2016, no conservation action had been taken, but an ecological advocacy group has called for the protection of a locality near Areni, Armenia, as a nature monument.
