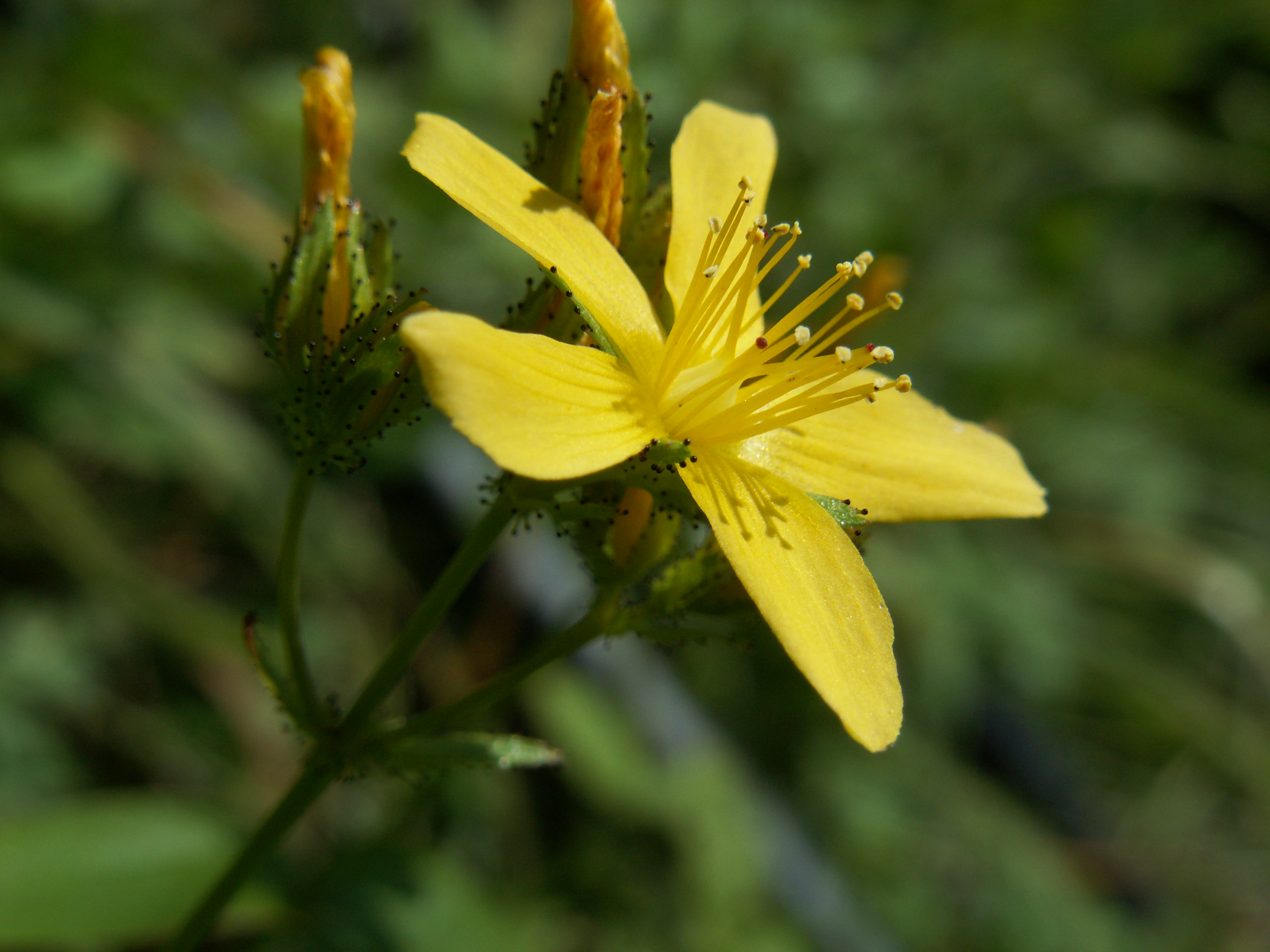
- Hypericum montanum

Scientific classification
- Kingdom: Plantae
- Clade: Tracheophytes
- Clade: Angiosperms
- Clade: Eudicots
- Clade: Rosids
- Order: Malpighiales
- Family: Hypericaceae
- Genus: Hypericum
- Section: Hypericum sect. Adenosepalum; Spach.

Type species
- Hypericum montanum L.

Subsections
- H. subsect. Adenosepalum; H. subsect. Aethiopica N. Robson; H. subsect. Caprifolia N. Robson; H. huber-morathii group

= Hypericum sect. Adenosepalum =

Group of flowering plants

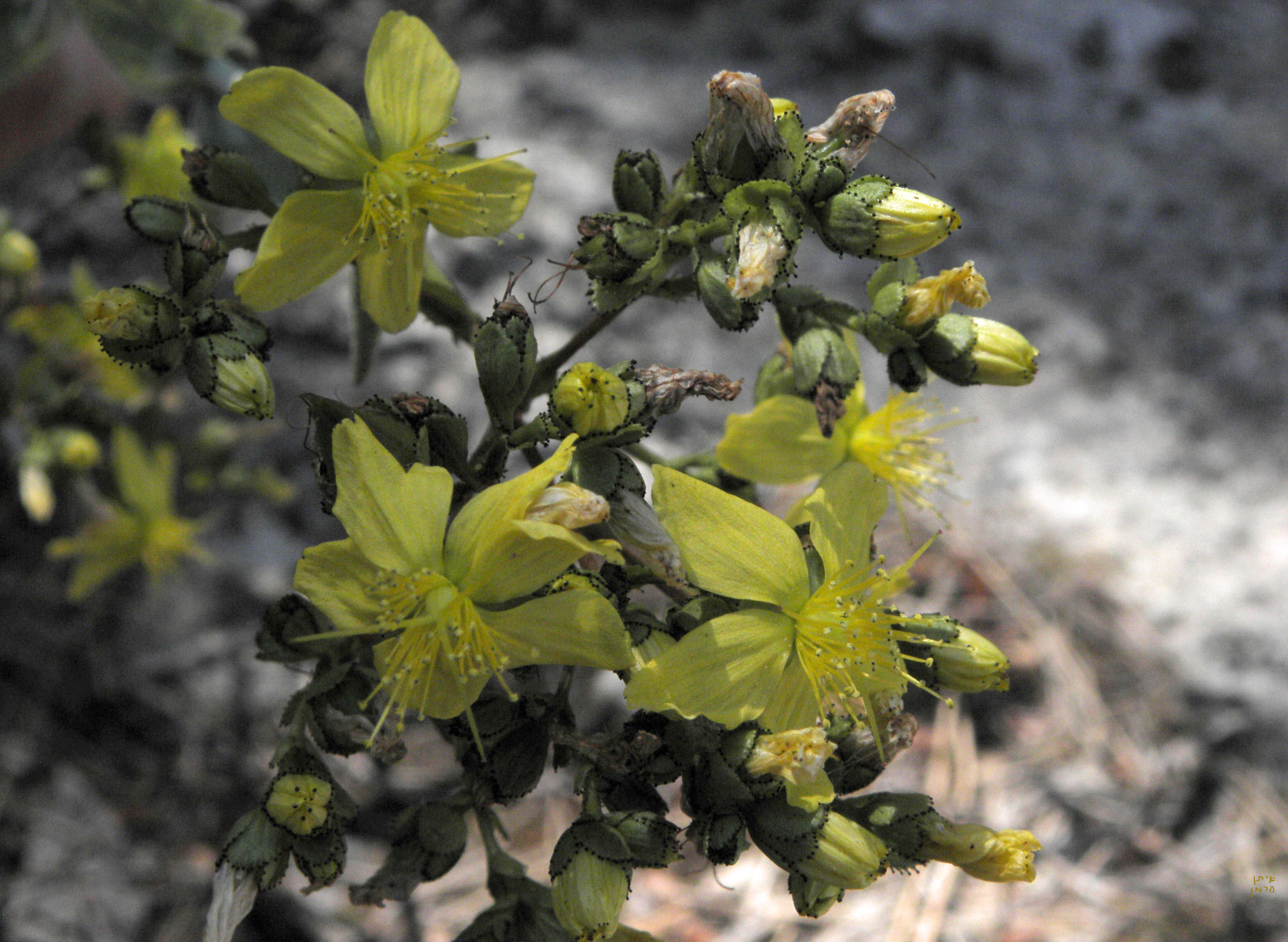
H. lanuginosum from subsect. Adenosepalum

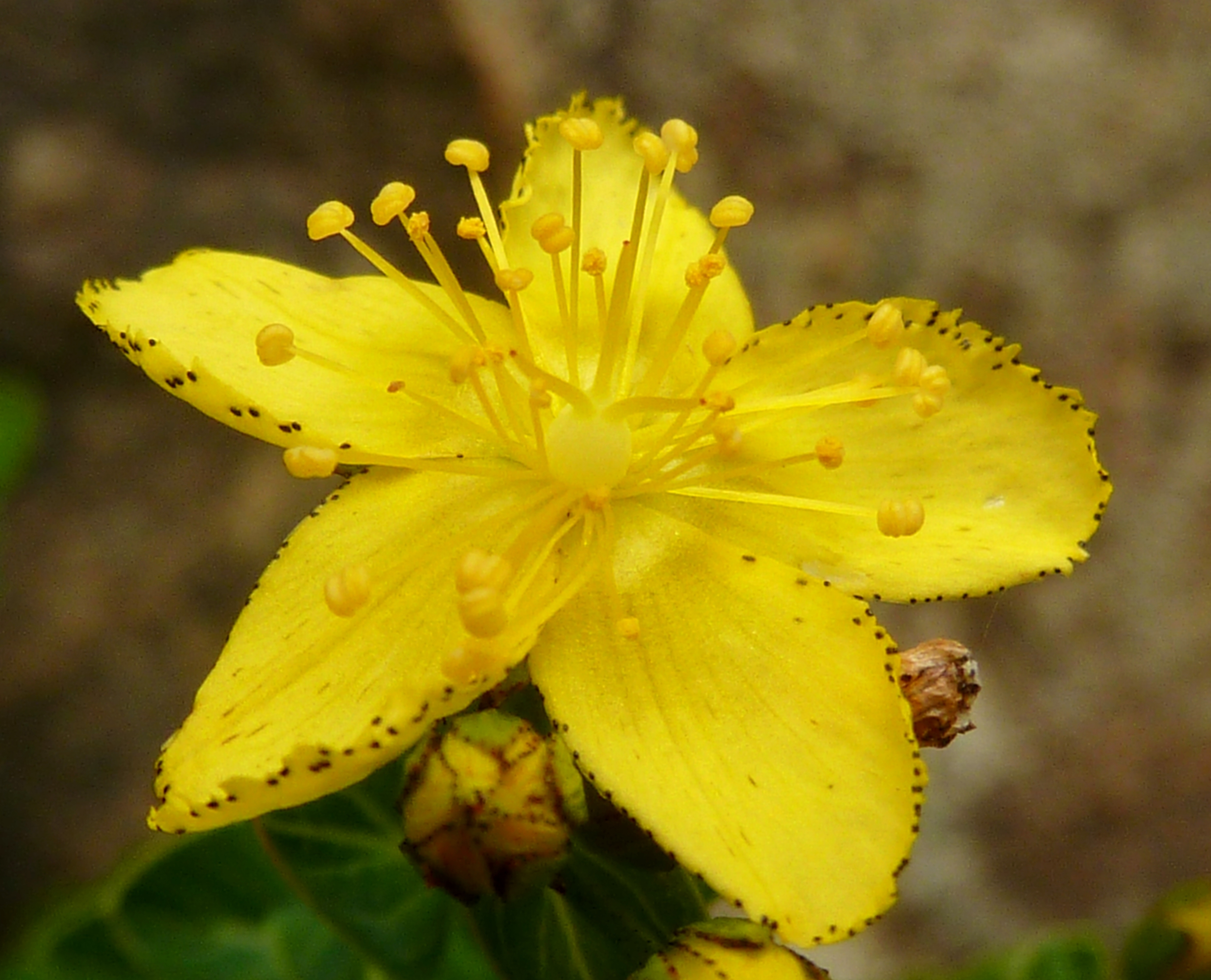
H. aethiopicum from subsect. Aethiopica

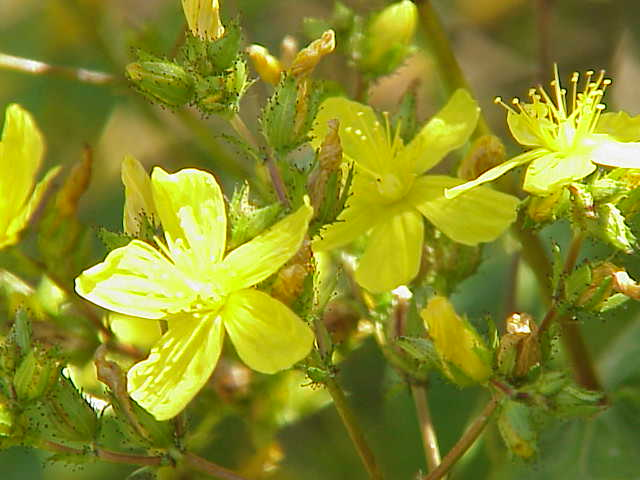
H. tomentosum from subsect. Caprifolia

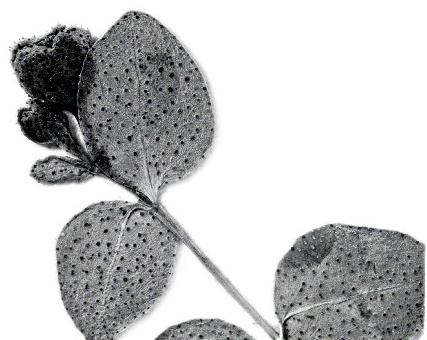
H. formosissimum from the Huber-Morathii group

Hypericum sect. Adenosepalum is one of 36 sections in the genus Hypericum. Its type species is Hypericum montanum.

== Distribution ==
Species in the section are found primarily in Western and Central Europe, Central Russia, the Caucasus, and Morocco.

== Description ==
The section contains a variety of types of plants including shrubs, shrublets, and wiry or soft herbs that grow to be up to 2.5 metres (8.2 ft) tall. If the species in the section are woody, they will be deciduous. They will either be glabrous or have simple hairs and have dark black glands on their leaves. The leaves are placed opposite but in very rare cases are 3-whorled.

== Species ==
Section Adenosepalum contains thirty species divided into four subsections as well as two nothospecies. In addition, H. annulatum has three recognized subspecies and H. aethiopicum has two.

- Family Hypericaceae Juss.
  - Genus Hypericum L.
    - Hypericum sect. Adenosepalum Spach.
      - subsect. Adenosepalum
        - H. annulatum Moris
          - H. annulatum subsp. afromontanum (Bullock) N. Robson
          - H. annulatum subsp. annulatum
          - H. annulatum subsp. intermedium (Steud. ex A.Rich.) N.Robson
        - H. athoum Boiss. & Orph.
        - H. atomarium Boiss.
        - H. cuisinii Barbey
        - H. delphicum Boiss. & Heldr.
        - H. lanuginosum Lam.
        - H. montanum L. (type species)
        - H. reflexum L.f.
      - subsect. Aethiopica N. Robson
        - H. abilianum N. Robson
        - H. aethiopicum Thunb.
          - H. aethiopicum subsp. aethiopicum
          - H. aethiopicum subsp. sonderi (Bredell) N. Robson
        - H. afrum Lam.
        - H. conjungens N. Robson
        - H. glandulosum Aiton
        - H. kiboënse Oliv.
      - subsect. Caprifolia
        - H. caprifolium Boiss.
        - H. coadunatum Chr. Sm.
        - H. collenetteae N. Robson
        - H. naudinianum Coss. & Durieu
        - H. psilophytum (Diels) Maire
        - H. pubescens Boiss.
        - H. scruglii Bacch., Brullo & Salmeri
        - H. sinaicum Hochst. ex Boiss.
        - H. somaliense N. Robson
        - H. tomentosum L.
      - Huber-Morathii group
        - H. decaisneanum Coss. & Daveau
        - H. formosissimum Takht.
        - H. huber-morathii N. Robson
        - H. minutum P.H.Davis & Poulter
        - H. sechmenii Ocak & O.Koyuncu
      - Nothospecies
        - H. × joerstadii Lid
        - H. pubescens × tomentosum
