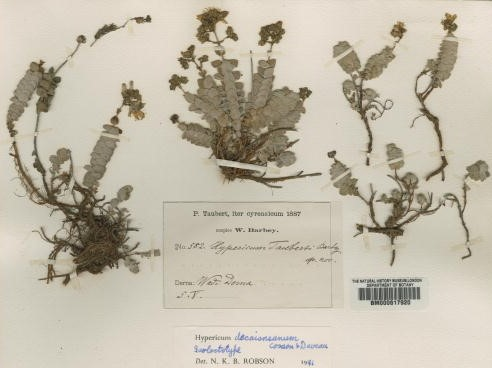

Scientific classification
- Kingdom: Plantae
- Clade: Tracheophytes
- Clade: Angiosperms
- Clade: Eudicots
- Clade: Rosids
- Order: Malpighiales
- Family: Hypericaceae
- Genus: Hypericum
- Section: Hypericum sect. Adenosepalum
- Species: H. decaisneanum

Binomial name
- Hypericum decaisneanum Coss. & Daveau
- Hypericum decaisneanum is found in the Jebel al Akhdar province of Libya.

Synonyms
- Hypericum taubertii Asch. & Barbey ex Coss.

= Hypericum decaisneanum =

Species of flowering plant

Hypericum decaisneanum is a species of flowering plant in the St John's wort family Hypericaceae. Named for French botanist Joseph Decaisne, it is a small perennial herb that grows mostly upright. It has thick, papery leaves and up to twenty flowers with bright yellow petals. Endemic to the Jebel al Akhdar province of Libya, H. decaisneanum is found in the cracks of limestone rocks on steep escarpments. It is a member of numerous plant communities and associations of chasmophytes, of which it is sometimes a key species. First described in 1899, the species was originally placed in section Taeniocarpium of the genus Hypericum, but more recently it has been considered a member of section Adenosepalum.

== Description ==
Hypericum decaisneanum is a perennial herb that grows mostly upright and can be 4–15 centimetres (1.6–5.9 inches) tall. The base of the plant can have visible roots, and its taproot is woody. It has many stems, but has no branches below its flower clusters.

The stems are covered in whitish-grey hairs, and are green on the upper parts of the plant and reddish on the lower parts. The leaves are crowded together and lack leaf stalks. The leaf blades are an oval shape, 0.6–1.2 cm (0.24–0.47 in) long and 0.4–1.0 cm (0.16–0.39 in) wide. They are the same color on the top and bottom, and have a thick, papery texture without any waxy coating. They have short hairs on their top side, and more dense hairs on the bottom. The leaf tip sometimes curls and is only somewhat pointed. There is no texture on the edges of the leaf, and the base is blunt. The leaf blades have a dense concentration of pale glands, and sometimes have a few black glands.

The flower clusters have between three and twenty flowers out of 1–4 distinct nodes. There are no flowering branches on the lower parts of the stem; all flowers are in a narrow pyramid-shaped or corymb-like cluster at the end of the stem. The bracts and bracteoles range in shape from stretched ovals to triangular lances, and have dense black glands. Individual flowers are around 1.2–1.5 cm (0.47–0.59 in) wide, and are an egg shape when budding. The sepals are 0.3–0.5 cm (0.12–0.20 in) long and 0.1 cm (0.039 in), but are usually around the same size on a flower. They range in shape from narrow and oblong to wide and elliptic, with a rounded end. They have pale glands in linear patterns, and sometimes several black dots near their end. The petals are bright yellow with red veins, and measure 0.6–0.8 cm (0.24–0.31 in) long and 0.3 cm (0.12 in) wide, or roughly 2.5 times the size of the sepals. They are oblong and have a rounded tip, rather than a pointed tip or apiculus. There may or may not be scattered pale and black glands on the petals. Each flower has around 40 stamens, the longest of which are 0.5–0.7 cm (0.20–0.28 in), or just shorter than the petals, and have a black anther gland. The ovary has the shape of a narrow, egg-like pyramid, with styles that are around 0.3–0.6 cm (0.12–0.24 in) long and curve inwards. The seed capsule is egg-shaped, and can be larger than the sepals. While the seed capsule is immature, it is enclosed by the petals which twist around each other.

Hypericum decaisneanum blooms in the late spring and early summer. In general, because of its dense and hairy leaves and the black glands on its petals, the species resembles a smaller form of Hypericum annulatum subsp. afromontanum.

== Etymology ==
One origin of the genus name Hypericum is that it is derived from the Greek words hyper (above) and eikon (picture), in reference to the tradition of hanging the plant over religious icons in the home. The specific epithet decaisneanum is in honor of French botanist Joseph Decaisne, who was a supporter of an expedition to collect the species.

== Taxonomy ==
The species was originally described by Ernest Cosson and Jules Alexandre Daveau in 1899 as Hypericum decaisneanum. In the description they listed the unresolved name H. taubertii as a synonym of the species, but did not provide reasoning for the inclusion. Cosson and Daveau placed H. decaisneanum in section Taeniocarpium based on their morphological observations. While most species of the genus Hypericum were included in a monographic study by Norman Robson in the 20th century, H. decaisneanum was not mentioned. Furthermore, its closest relatives were later addended to the monograph, and their infrageneric relationships were discussed. (Note: The related species were H. formosissimum, H. huber-morathii, and H. minutum.) However, H. decaisneanum was neglected from the later editions of the monograph as well. In an online edition of the monograph published in 2013, the species was included by Norman Robson and his colleague David Pattinson within a "Huber-morathii group" inside sect. Adenosepalum. Under that classification, the placement of Hypericum decaisneanum was summarized as follows:

Hypericum

Hypericum sect. Adenosepalum

Huber-morathii group

H. decaisneanum – H. formosissimum – H. huber-morathii – H. minutum – H. sechmenii

== Distribution and habitat ==
Hypericum decaisneanum is native to the Jebel al Akhdar province of Libya. It is found in the crevices of limestone rocks at elevations of 20–700 metres (66–2,297 feet). In particular, it is found on the north-facing slopes of major escarpments.

== Ecology and propagation ==
Hypericum decaisneanum belongs to plant communities that have been the subject of several research endeavors. It has been noted to be part of an association of chasmophytes that centers around Micromeria conferta and Reaumuria mucronata. (Note: The other members of the association are Cyclamen rohlfsianum, Rhamnus, Varthemia candicans and Thymus capitatus.) It is also a part of one species association called "Athamantion dellae-cellae", (Note: The other members of the association are Asperula cyrenaica, Athamanta della-cellae, Daphne jasminea, Erica sicula, Micromeria conferta, Origanum cyrenaicum, Ptilostemon gnaphaloides, Sedum cyrenaicum, and Stachys rosea.) and is a key species in another alliance called "Sedo micranthi-Hypericetum decaisneani" along with Sedum album and other chasmophytes. (Note: The other members of the association are Micromeria conferta, Stachys rosea, Chiliadenus candicans, and Petrorhagia illyrica.)

Like other species in the Huber-morathii group, H. decaisneanum can be cultivated in dry, rocky crevices with poor soil and protection against winter wetness. It can be propagated by seeding in spring under a thin layer of soil, and has a germination period of 1–3 months. Cuttings are taken in the late summer.
