= Hypericum abilianum =

Scientific classification
- Kingdom: Plantae
- Clade: Tracheophytes
- Clade: Angiosperms
- Clade: Eudicots
- Clade: Rosids
- Order: Malpighiales
- Family: Hypericaceae
- Genus: Hypericum
- Species: H. abilianum

Binomial name
- Hypericum abilianum N.Robson

Species of flowering plant

Hypericum abilianum is a shrub in the genus Hypericum, in the section Adenosepalum, known only from one specimen collected in Africa.

== Description ==
The species is a subshrub 40 centimeters tall with orange to red stems. It has 3–5 flowers that are each approximately 15 mm in diameter. Its golden yellow petals are 8–10 mm long and 4 mm broad, tinged with red on the upper surfaces.

== Distribution ==
It has only been found in Angola, but no conclusive distribution data has been found. The single cataloged specimen was gathered in the Huíla Province in 1960 by E.J. Mendes.
