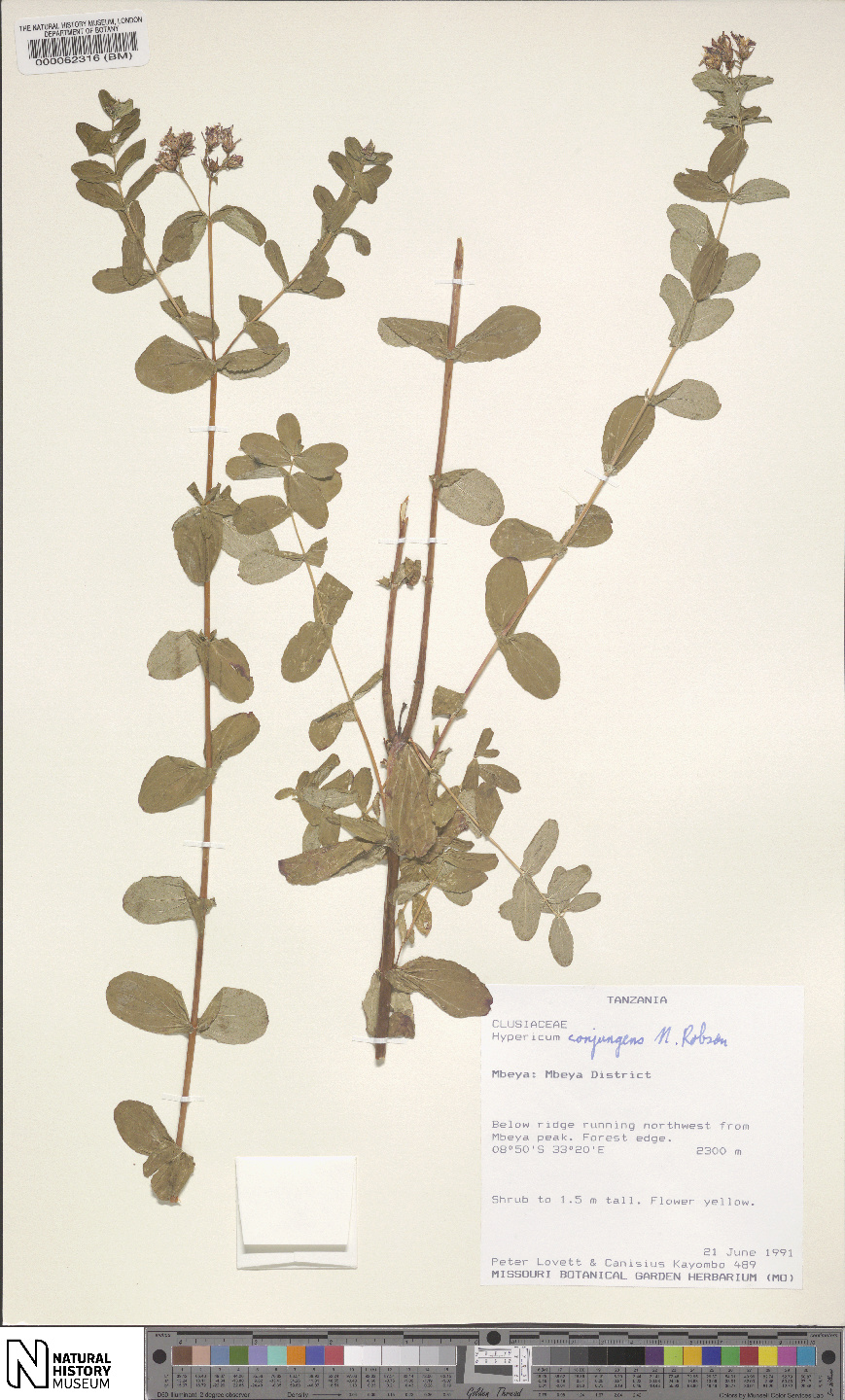

Scientific classification
- Kingdom: Plantae
- Clade: Tracheophytes
- Clade: Angiosperms
- Clade: Eudicots
- Clade: Rosids
- Order: Malpighiales
- Family: Hypericaceae
- Genus: Hypericum
- Subsection: H. subsect. Aethiopica
- Species: H. conjungens

Binomial name
- Hypericum conjungens N.Robson

= Hypericum conjungens =

Species of flowering plant

Hypericum conjungens is a perennial herb in the genus Hypericum, in the section Adenosepalum, subsect. Aethiopicum.
