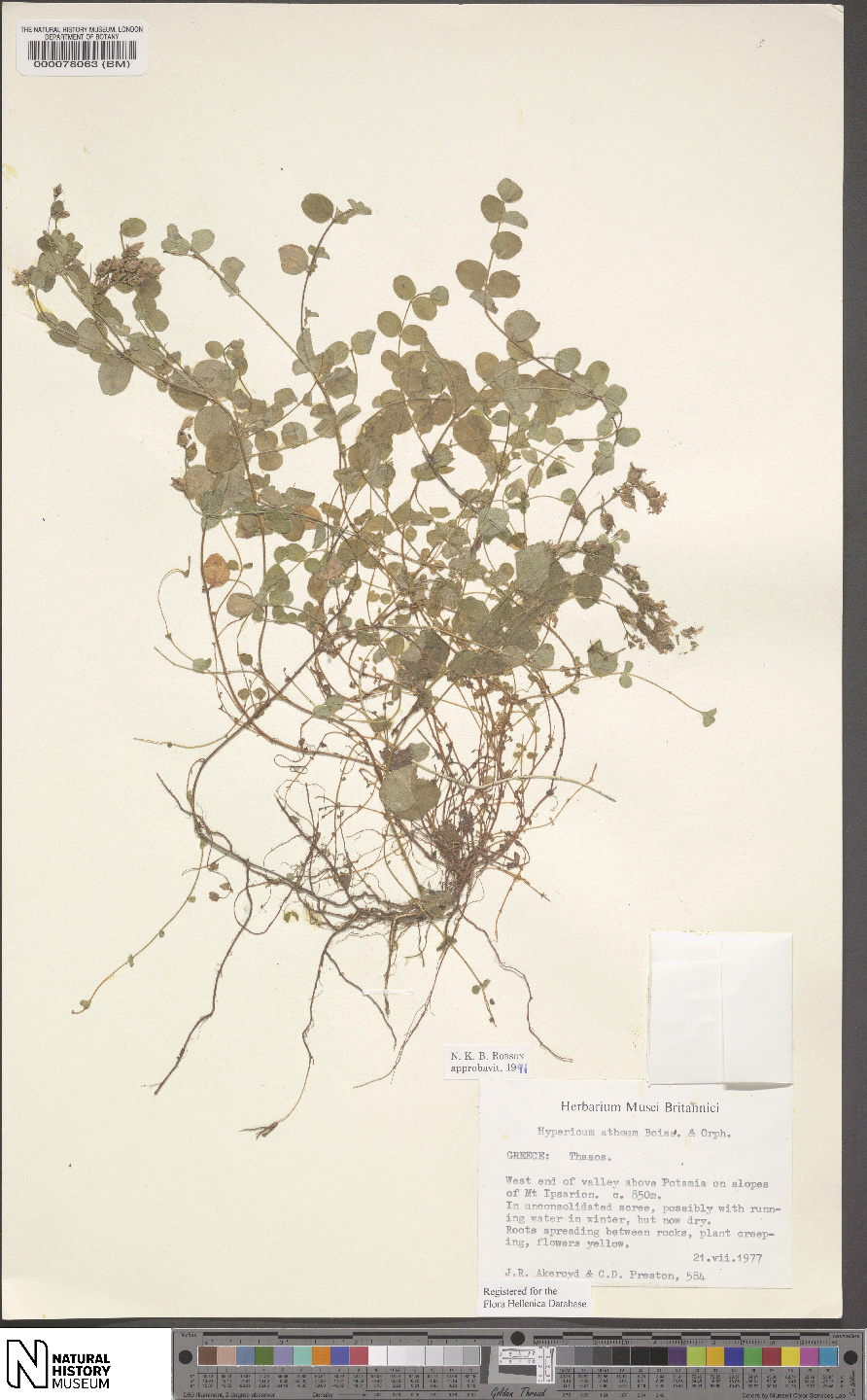

Scientific classification
- Kingdom: Plantae
- Clade: Tracheophytes
- Clade: Angiosperms
- Clade: Eudicots
- Clade: Rosids
- Order: Malpighiales
- Family: Hypericaceae
- Genus: Hypericum
- Section: Hypericum sect. Adenosepalum
- Species: H. athoum

Binomial name
- Hypericum athoum Boiss. & Orph.
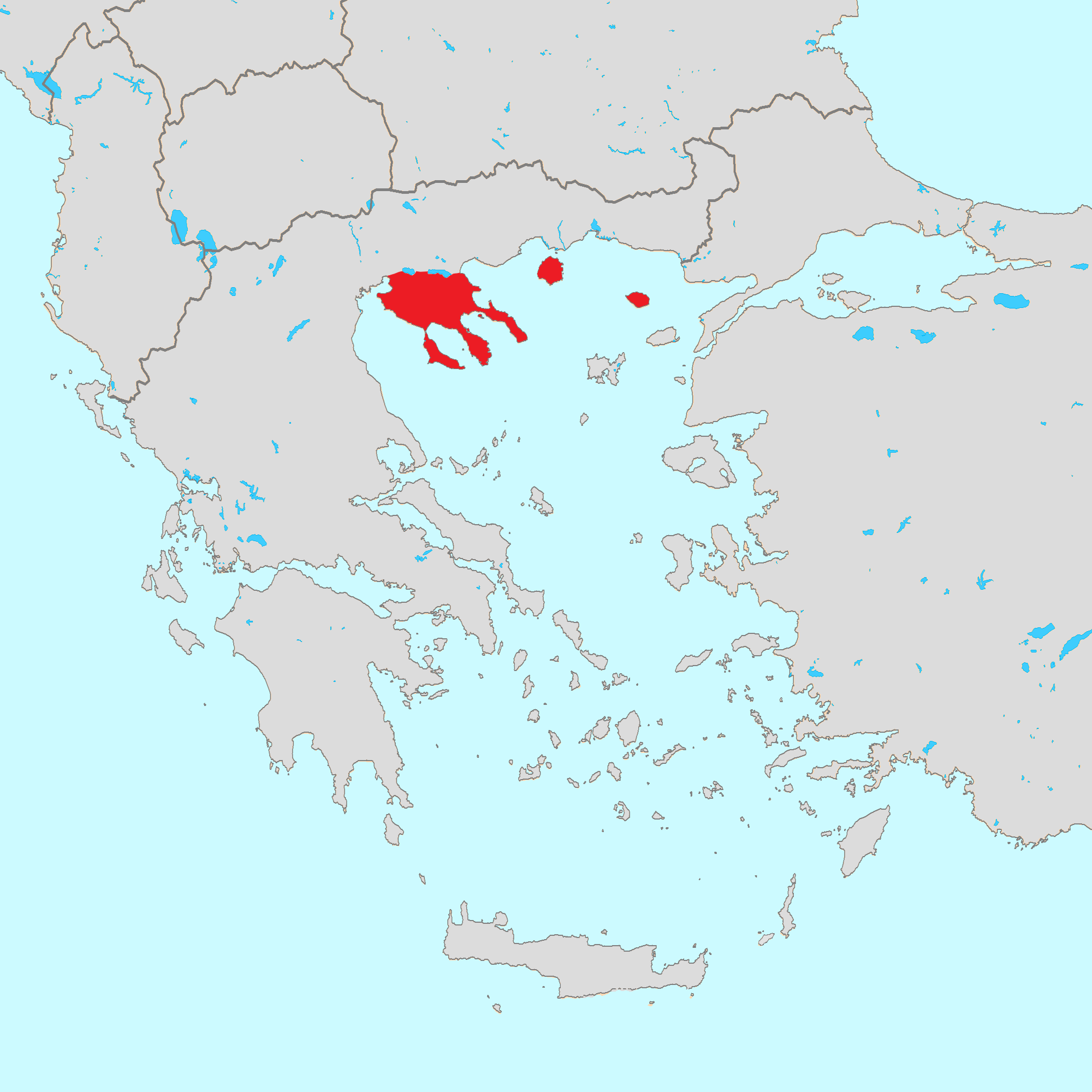

Synonyms
- Hypericum sanctum Degen

= Hypericum athoum =

Species of flowering plant

Hypericum athoum is a perennial herb in the Hypericaceae family. It is endemic to Greece.

== Description ==
Its flowers have 5 petals and its leaves are 8–15 mm long. The species's stem is 10–25 centimetres (4–10 in) long, and its root system is that of a taproot.
