= Calliostoma formosissimum =

Scientific classification
- Kingdom: Animalia
- Phylum: Mollusca
- Class: Gastropoda
- Subclass: Vetigastropoda
- Order: Trochida
- Superfamily: Trochoidea
- Family: Calliostomatidae
- Subfamily: Calliostomatinae
- Genus: Calliostoma
- Species: †C. formosissimum

Binomial name
- †Calliostoma formosissimum (G. Seguenza, 1876)

Synonyms
- Trochus (Zizyphinus) formosissimus G. Seguenza, 1876

Extinct species of gastropod

Calliostoma formosissimum is an extinct species of sea snail, a marine gastropod mollusk, in the family Calliostomatidae within the superfamily Trochoidea, the top snails, turban snails and their allies.
