= Hypericum thymopsis =

Scientific classification
- Kingdom: Plantae
- Clade: Tracheophytes
- Clade: Angiosperms
- Clade: Eudicots
- Clade: Rosids
- Order: Malpighiales
- Family: Hypericaceae
- Genus: Hypericum
- Subsection: Hypericum subsect. Platyadenum
- Species: H. thymopsis

Binomial name
- Hypericum thymopsis Boiss.

Synonyms
- Hypericum aspera Jaub. & Spach.

Species of flowering plant in the St John's wort family

Hypericum thymopsis is a species of flowering plant in the family Hypericaceae which is endemic to Turkey.
