= Arayit Mountain =

Mountain in Turkey

- Arayit Dağı, Hacıçalı Tepesi
- Location within Turkey

Highest point
- Elevation: 1,819 m (5,968 ft)
- Coordinates: 39°18′11″N 31°45′01″E

Geography
- Location: Eskişehir Province, Turkey

Arayit Mountain is a mountain in the Sivrihisar district, Eskişehir Province in central Turkey. It is considered part of the Sivrihisar Mountains range and reaches a height of about 1,819 m. The mountain is located between Sivrihisar and Gunyuzu, and a number of natural sites, including several caves, originate from the eastern stope.

Arayit Mountain is part of the area known as Acikir Bozkirlari, an important nature conservation area.The height of the mountain varies from 650 to 1819 m. Geologically, it is composed of karts rocks and surrounded by steppe plant communities, including endemic species.
