= Kaymaz =

- Neighbourhood
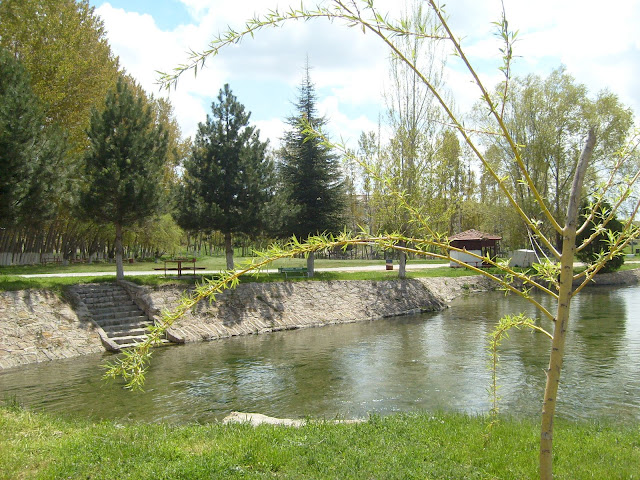

- Location within Turkey Location within Turkey Central Anatolia
- Coordinates: 39°31′N 31°11′E
- Country: Turkey
- Province: Eskişehir
- District: Sivrihisar
- Elevation: 970 m (3,180 ft)
- Population (2022): 1,058
- Time zone: UTC+3 (TRT)
- Postal code: 26600
- Area code: 0222

Kaymaz is a neighbourhood of the municipality and district of Sivrihisar, Eskişehir Province, Turkey. Its population is 1,058 (2022). Before the 2013 reorganisation, it was a town (belde). It is situated on Turkish state highway D.200 which connects Eskişehir to Ankara. It is 65 kilometres (40 mi) south east of Eskişehir and 36 kilometres (22 mi) west of Sivrihisar. The town is an historical settlement and it was named as Troknada during the Phyrgiaan kingdom. Later it was renamed as Kaytrus and eventually the name Kaymaz was adopted.

In 1963, it was declared a seat of township. There are various ruins around the town. In contrast to general scenery of Central Anatolia, Kaymaz is a watery town thanks to Kaymaz Dam to the north east of the town. It is also known as Yeşilkaymaz ("Green Kaymaz"). Beans and cherries are the main products of the town.

It has an annual Festival of Kuru Fasulye ("Festival of haricot")

== See also ==
- Kuru fasulye
