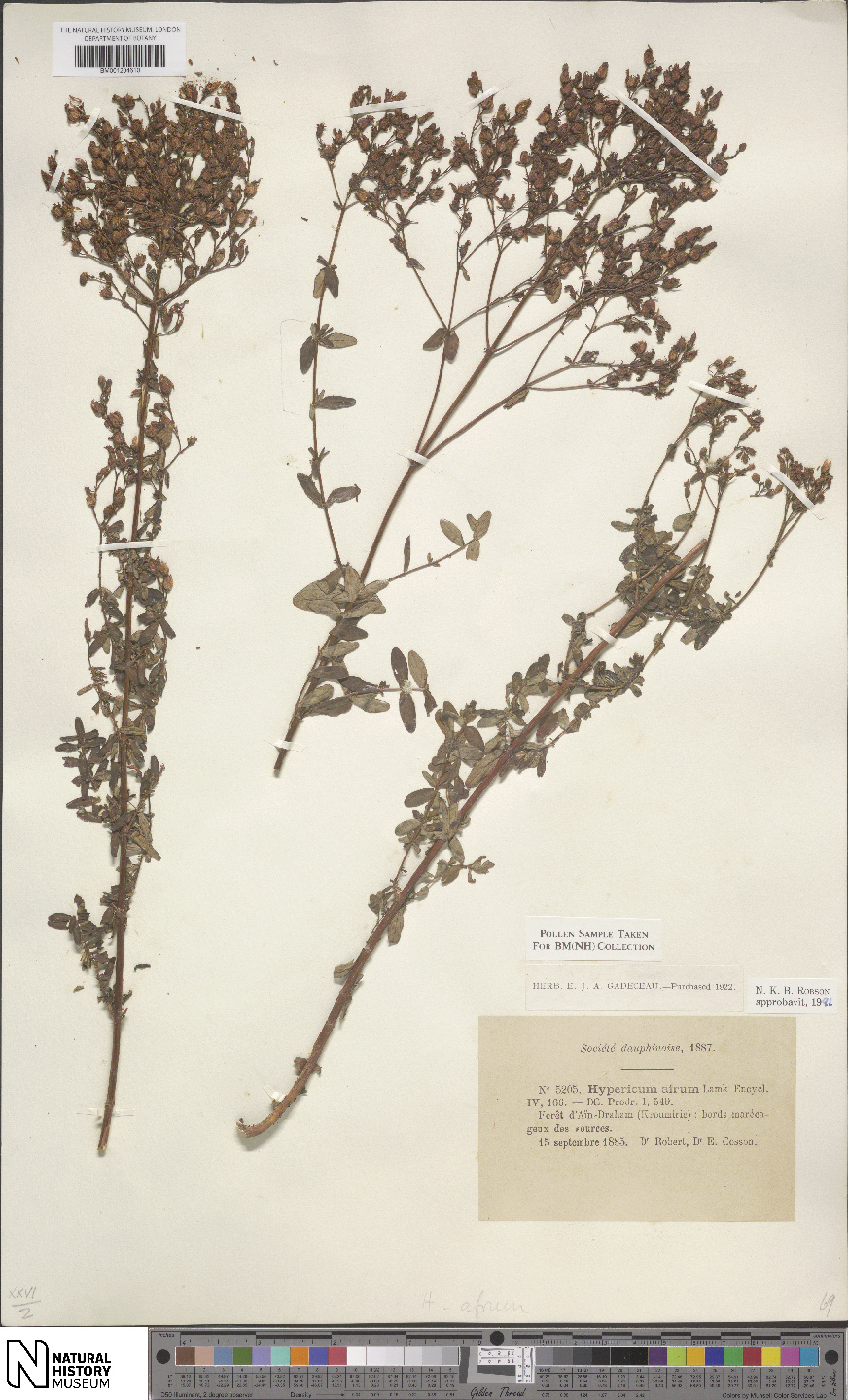

Scientific classification
- Kingdom: Plantae
- Clade: Tracheophytes
- Clade: Angiosperms
- Clade: Eudicots
- Clade: Rosids
- Order: Malpighiales
- Family: Hypericaceae
- Genus: Hypericum
- Subsection: H. subsect. Aethiopica
- Species: H. afrum

Binomial name
- Hypericum afrum Lam.

= Hypericum afrum =

Species of flowering plant

Hypericum afrum is a perennial herb in the genus Hypericum, in the section Adenosepalum, subsect. Aethiopicum.

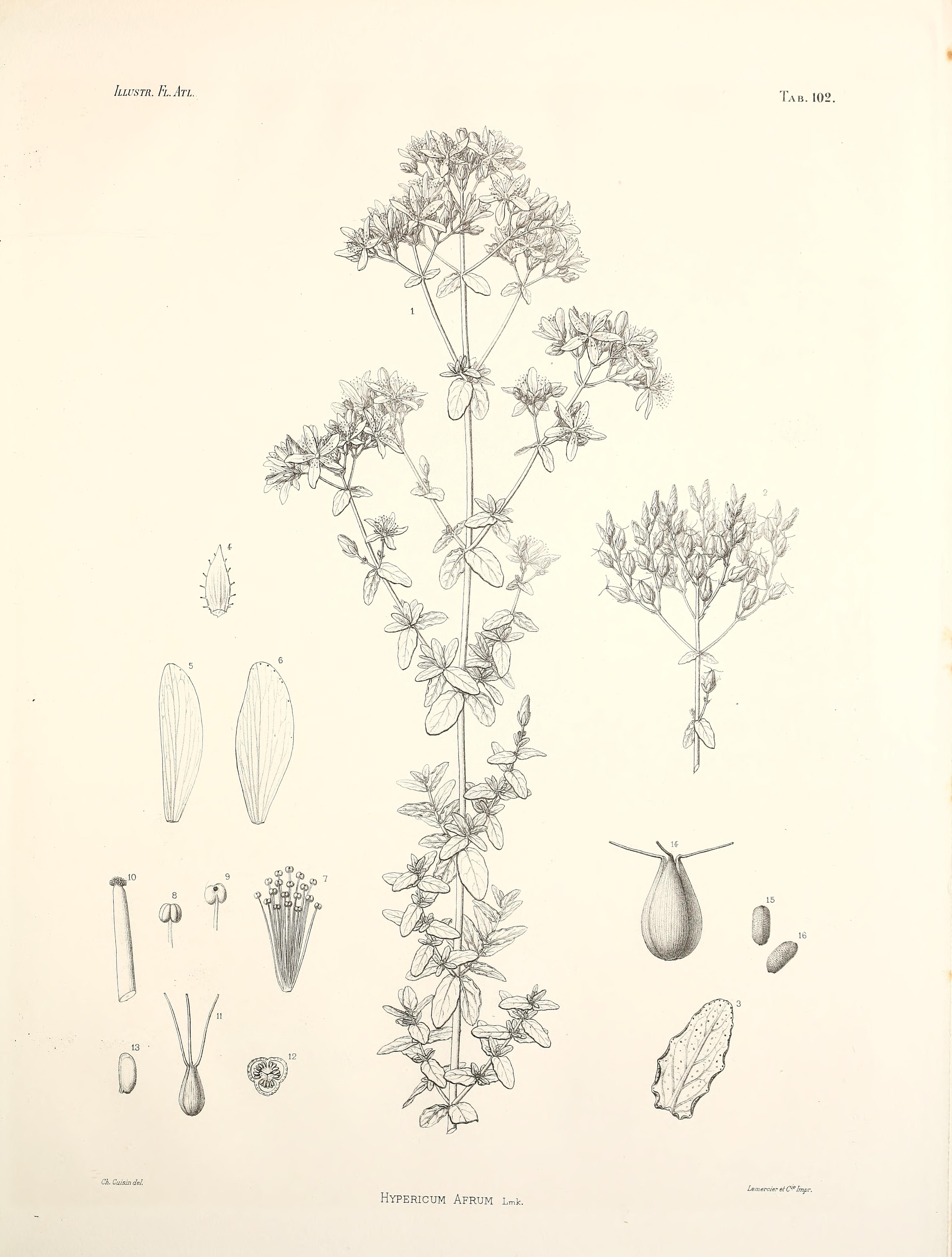
Hypericum afrum
