= African Natural History =

- Discipline: Natural history
- Language: English

Publication details
- Former name(s): Annals of the South African Museum
- History: 2005-2016
- Publisher: Iziko Museums (South Africa)
- Frequency: Annually

Standard abbreviations
- ISO 4: Afr. Nat. Hist.

Indexing
- ISSN: 1816-8396

Links
- Journal homepage

African Natural History was a scientific journal published by Iziko Museums (Cape Town). It took the place of the Annals of the South African Museum, which has been discontinued. Now the journal has been discontinued.
