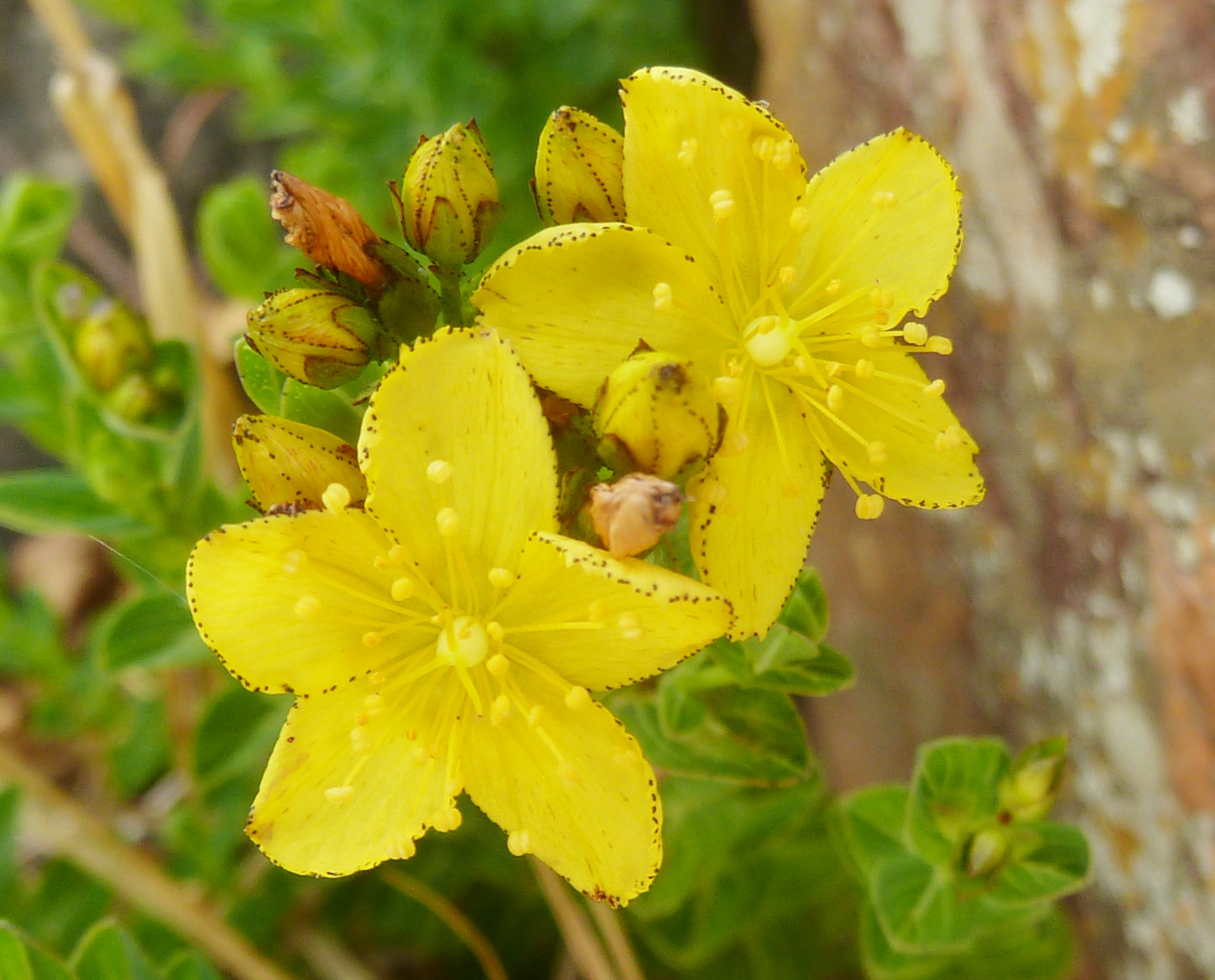

Scientific classification
- Kingdom: Plantae
- Clade: Tracheophytes
- Clade: Angiosperms
- Clade: Eudicots
- Clade: Rosids
- Order: Malpighiales
- Family: Hypericaceae
- Genus: Hypericum
- Section: Hypericum sect. Adenosepalum
- Subsection: H. subsect. Aethiopica
- Species: H. aethiopicum

Binomial name
- Hypericum aethiopicum Thunb.

= Hypericum aethiopicum =

Species of flowering plant

Hypericum aethiopicum is a perennial herb in the genus Hypericum, in the section Adenosepalum. It is the type species of subsect. Aethiopicum.
