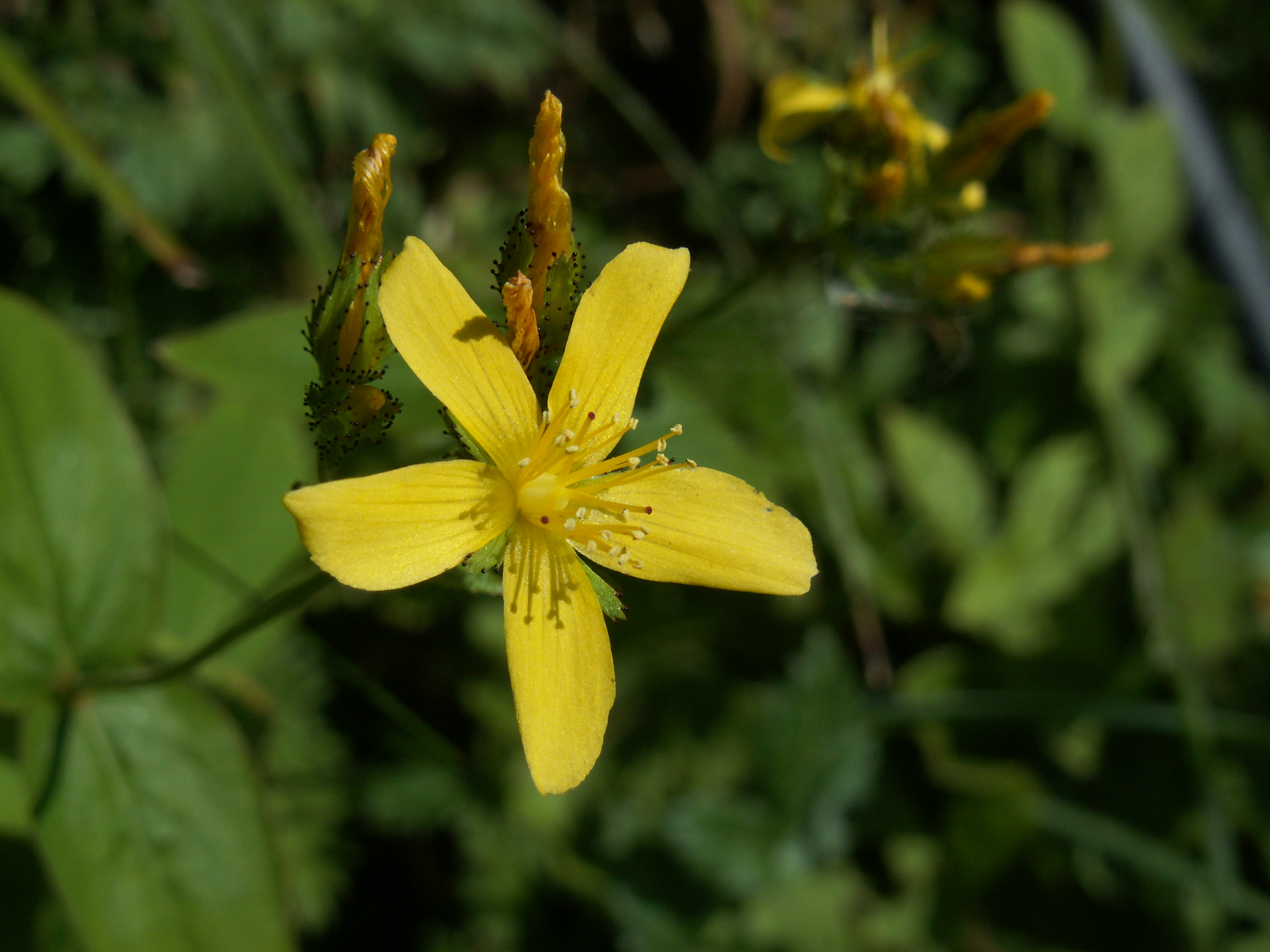

Scientific classification
- Kingdom: Plantae
- Clade: Tracheophytes
- Clade: Angiosperms
- Clade: Eudicots
- Clade: Rosids
- Order: Malpighiales
- Family: Hypericaceae
- Genus: Hypericum
- Section: Hypericum sect. Adenosepalum
- Species: H. montanum

Binomial name
- Hypericum montanum L.

= Hypericum montanum =

Species of flowering plant

Hypericum montanum is a plant species in the genus Hypericum commonly known as pale St. John's-wort or mountain St. John's wort. It is native to Eurasia and Morocco in North Africa.

== Description ==
Hypericum montanum are normally from 20 to 80 centimeters (8–32 inches). Its flower has five petals and it flowers from July to August.
