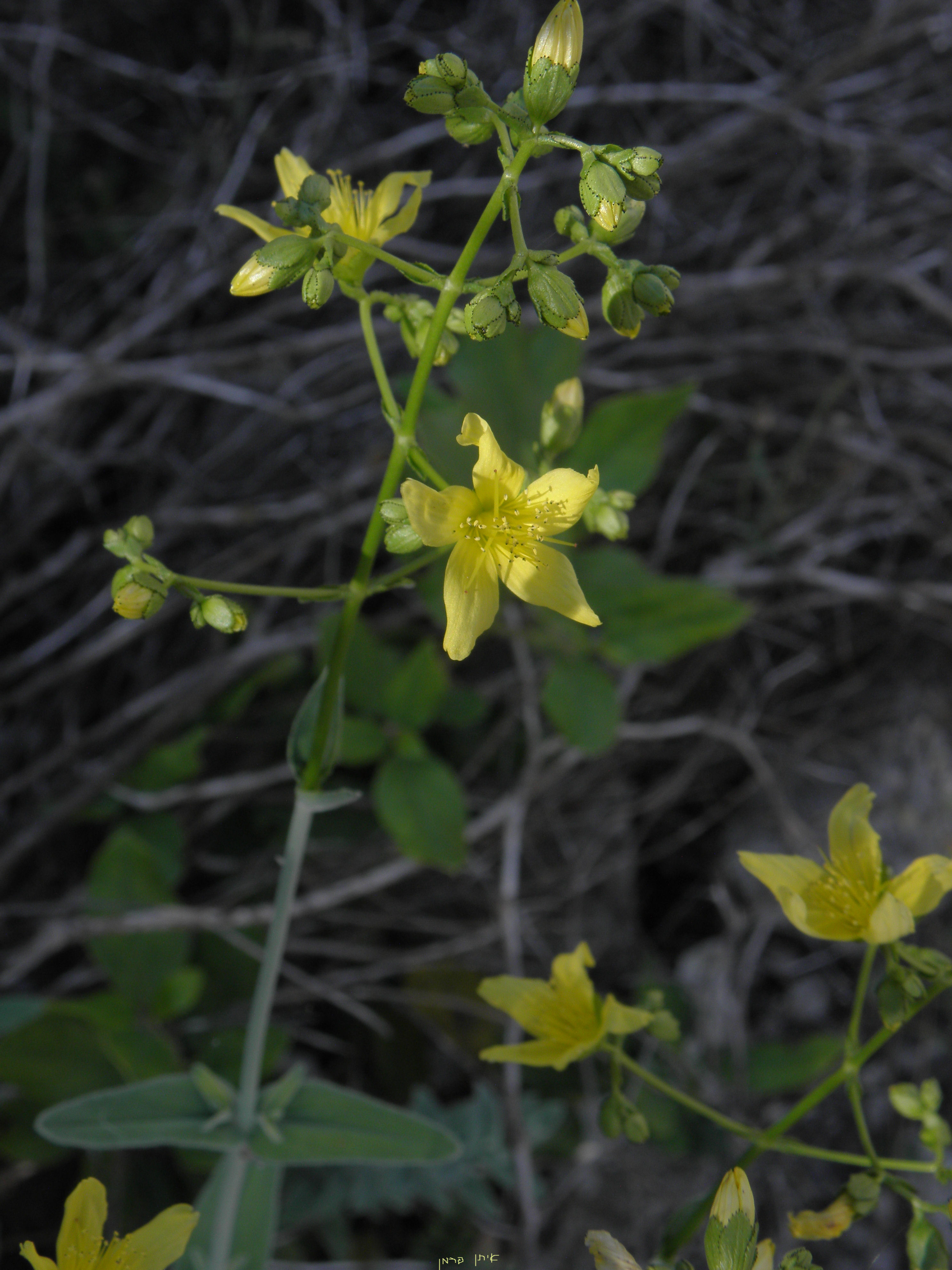

Scientific classification
- Kingdom: Plantae
- Clade: Tracheophytes
- Clade: Angiosperms
- Clade: Eudicots
- Clade: Rosids
- Order: Malpighiales
- Family: Hypericaceae
- Genus: Hypericum
- Section: Hypericum sect. Adenosepalum
- Species: H. lanuginosum

Binomial name
- Hypericum lanuginosum Lam.

Synonyms
- Hypericum gracile; Hypericum lanuginosum; subsp. gracile: Hypericum lanuginosum subsp. millepunctatum; Hypericum lanuginosum var. pestalozzae; Hypericum lanuginosum var. scabrellum; Hypericum lanuginosum var. β gracile; Hypericum lanuginosum var. lanuginosum; Hypericum pestalozzae; Hypericum scabrellum

= Hypericum lanuginosum =

Species of flowering plant in the St John's wort family

Hypericum lanuginosum, or downy St. John's wort, is a perennial herb, a flowering plant in the St. John's wort family Hypericaceae.

== Description ==
The species grows from 10 to 80 centimeters (4 to 31 in) tall. It has a woody rootstock with few stems. Its leaves have dense whitish veins and are subglabrous on both surfaces. The stems are green and terete and have 2–4 lined internodes. The dimensions of the leaves are 15–60 mm by 5–25 mm. Its flowers are 15–20 mm in diameter and are rounded.

== Distribution and habitat ==
Hypericum lanuginosum is found in Sinai, Southern Turkey, Western Syria, Lebanon, Israel, Jordan, and Cyprus. Its habitat is in moist, shady areas, usually by rocks, 0–2,400 meters (0–7,874 ft) from sea level.
