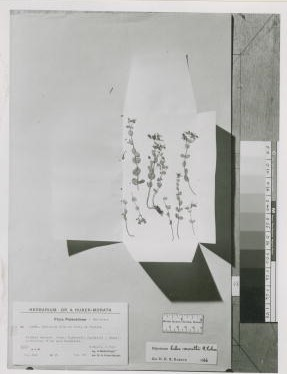

Scientific classification
- Kingdom: Plantae
- Clade: Tracheophytes
- Clade: Angiosperms
- Clade: Eudicots
- Clade: Rosids
- Order: Malpighiales
- Family: Hypericaceae
- Genus: Hypericum
- Section: Hypericum sect. Adenosepalum
- Species: H. huber-morathii

Binomial name
- Hypericum huber-morathii N. Robson

= Hypericum huber-morathii =

Species of flowering plant in the St John's wort family

Hypericum huber-morathii is a species of flowering plant in the St John's wort family Hypericaceae. It is a small perennial herb with few stems. It has narrow and brittle stems, thick leaves, flowers in clusters of varying numbers, small yellow petals, around twenty stamens, and three styles. H. huber-morathii is closely related to H. minutum and H. sechmenii, and also shares characteristics with H. lanuginosum. The plant is endemic to Turkey, and is found among limestone rocks in a limited region of southwestern Anatolia. Originally excluded from a comprehensive monograph of Hypericum, the species' placement within the genus is unclear. It has been placed in both section Adenosepalum and section Origanifolium.

== Etymology ==
The genus name Hypericum is possibly derived from the Greek words hyper (above) and eikon (picture), in reference to the tradition of hanging the plant over religious icons in the home. The Swiss botanist Arthur Huber-Morath was the first to collect the species, and the specific epithet huber-morathii is in reference to him. In Turkish, the plant is known as özge kantaron.

== Description ==
Hypericum huber-morathii is a small perennial herb that grows 8–15 centimeters (3.1–5.9 in) tall. It is entirely hairless, with a few stems that grow upright from a mostly flat base. They usually do not branch out beneath the flower clusters. The stems are narrow, roughly cylindrical, brittle in texture, and lack glands. The leaves have a very short stalk or are almost directly attached to the stem. The leaf blades are 0.5–0.9 cm long by 0.4–0.6 cm wide and are the shape of an oblong to wide oval or a more triangular oval. They are rather thick, with a rounded tip and a flat or wide wedge-shaped base. There are many pale glands on the surface of the leaf, while there are dense clusters of black glands along its edges.

The flowers are in clusters that vary in number widely. There are usually 3–12 per cluster, but up to 30 have been observed. The cluster can vary in shape from somewhat corymb-like to a wide pyramid or rarely more cylindrical. The flowers are roughly 0.8 cm wide and grow from two or three nodes. The leaf-like bracts are oblong and have black glands. The sepals are around 0.25 cm long and 1.5 cm wide; they are all the same size and overlap one another. They have many point-shaped black glands on their surface and edges. The plant's petals are small and yellow, with a blunt lance shape. They have one or two black glands on their edges. Each flower has 18–20 stamens and 3 styles, and its ovary is 0.15 cm long.

Hypericum huber-morathii can be told apart from its closest relatives, H. sechmenii and H. minutum, by several characteristics. These include its longer stems, greater number of flowers per cluster, more pointed sepals, black instead of amber glands on its petals, and earlier flowering period in June. In general, the plant has an appearance that is between that of H. lanuginosum and H. minutum.

== Taxonomy ==
The species was first described as Hypericum huber-morathii by Norman Robson in 1967 in the journal Notes from the Royal Botanic Garden, Edinburgh. It was originally excluded in error from a comprehensive monograph of the genus Hypericum by Robson, along with the related species H. formosissimum and H. minutum. A later edition in 1996 corrected the mistake and discussed the morphology and relationships of H. huber-morathii. However, it introduced ambiguity as to which section of Hypericum the species belonged. Robson acknowledged that it and the two other excluded species should have been included in his treatment of sect. Adenosepalum, but then advocated for their inclusion in sect. Origanifolia based on the structure of their vittae, which would relate them most closely to Hypericum aviculariifolium in the latter section. According to Robson, removing the three species, along with several others related to Hypericum elodeoides, would lead to a "purified" sect. Adenosepalum forming a "natural group" of species.

Further complicating the contradiction was the species' later inclusion by Norman Robson and his colleague David Pattinson within a "Huber-morathii group" inside sect. Adenosepalum in the online edition of the monograph in 2013. Under that classification, the placement of Hypericum huber-morathii was summarized as follows:

Hypericum

Hypericum subg. Hypericum

Hypericum sect. Adenosepalum

Huber-morathii group

H. decaisneanum – H. formosissimum – H. huber-morathii – H. minutum – H. sechmenii

The name was accepted again in 2010 in a cladistic analysis of the genus, and in a review of the taxonomy of Hypericum by Robson and Sara Crockett in 2011, though no clarification was given as to its classification within the genus in either report.

== Distribution, habitat, and ecology ==
The type locality for Hypericum huber-morathii

Hypericum huber-morathii is one of eight species of Hypericum sect. Adenosepalum that are native to Turkey. Its holotype was collected 19 kilometers west of Korkuteli in Antalya province of Anatolia. The species' habitat is among limestone rocks at elevations of 1,200–1,250 meters (3,940–4,100 ft), where it is found in association with Centaurea werneri, another Turkish perennial herb. A 1997 plant registry by the World Conservation Monitoring Centre listed the species as a "single-country endemic" to Turkey that was considered Rare.

Propagation of Hypericum huber-morathii is undertaken by planting seeds in the spring, barely covering them in soil. They are then allowed to germinate for 1–3 months at a temperature of 10–16 °C (50–61 °F). The plants grow best in sunny, dry rock crevices with protection from winter dampness. Division is done in the spring, while cuttings are taken in the late summer.
