= Hypericum sinaicum =

Scientific classification
- Kingdom: Plantae
- Clade: Tracheophytes
- Clade: Angiosperms
- Clade: Eudicots
- Clade: Rosids
- Order: Malpighiales
- Family: Hypericaceae
- Genus: Hypericum
- Section: Hypericum sect. Adenosepalum
- Species: H. sinaicum

Binomial name
- Hypericum sinaicum Hochst. ex Boiss.

Synonyms
- None

Species of plant

Hypericum sinaicum is a perennial herb in the genus Hypericum, in the section Adenosepalum.

== Description ==
The species grows to be 0.1-0.35 meters tall. Its stems are generally green but often have a reddish hue. Its petals are a pale yellow and can have faint red veins. Its seeds are a dark reddish brown. H. sinaicum is very similar in appearance to Hypericum collenetteae.

== Distribution ==
Hypericum sincaicum is found in the Sinai Peninsula, Northern Saudi Arabia, and parts of Jordan.
