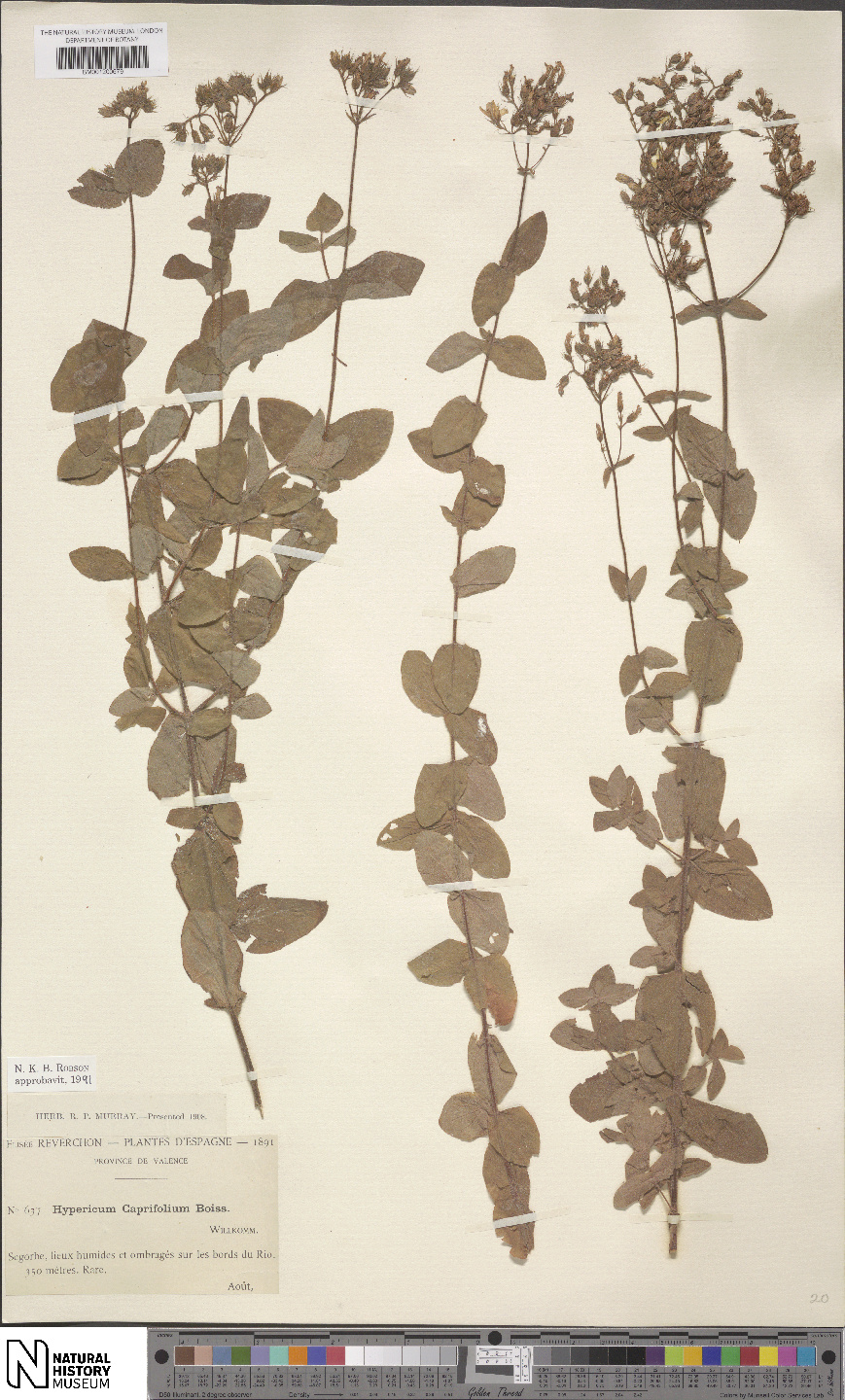

Scientific classification
- Kingdom: Plantae
- Clade: Tracheophytes
- Clade: Angiosperms
- Clade: Eudicots
- Clade: Rosids
- Order: Malpighiales
- Family: Hypericaceae
- Genus: Hypericum
- Section: Hypericum sect. Adenosepalum
- Species: H. caprifolium

Binomial name
- Hypericum caprifolium Boiss.

Synonyms
- Hypericum hirsutum Asso

= Hypericum caprifolium =

Species of perennial herb

Hypericum caprifolium is a perennial herb in the family Hypericaceae. It is the type species of subsect. Caprifolia in the section Adenosepalum.

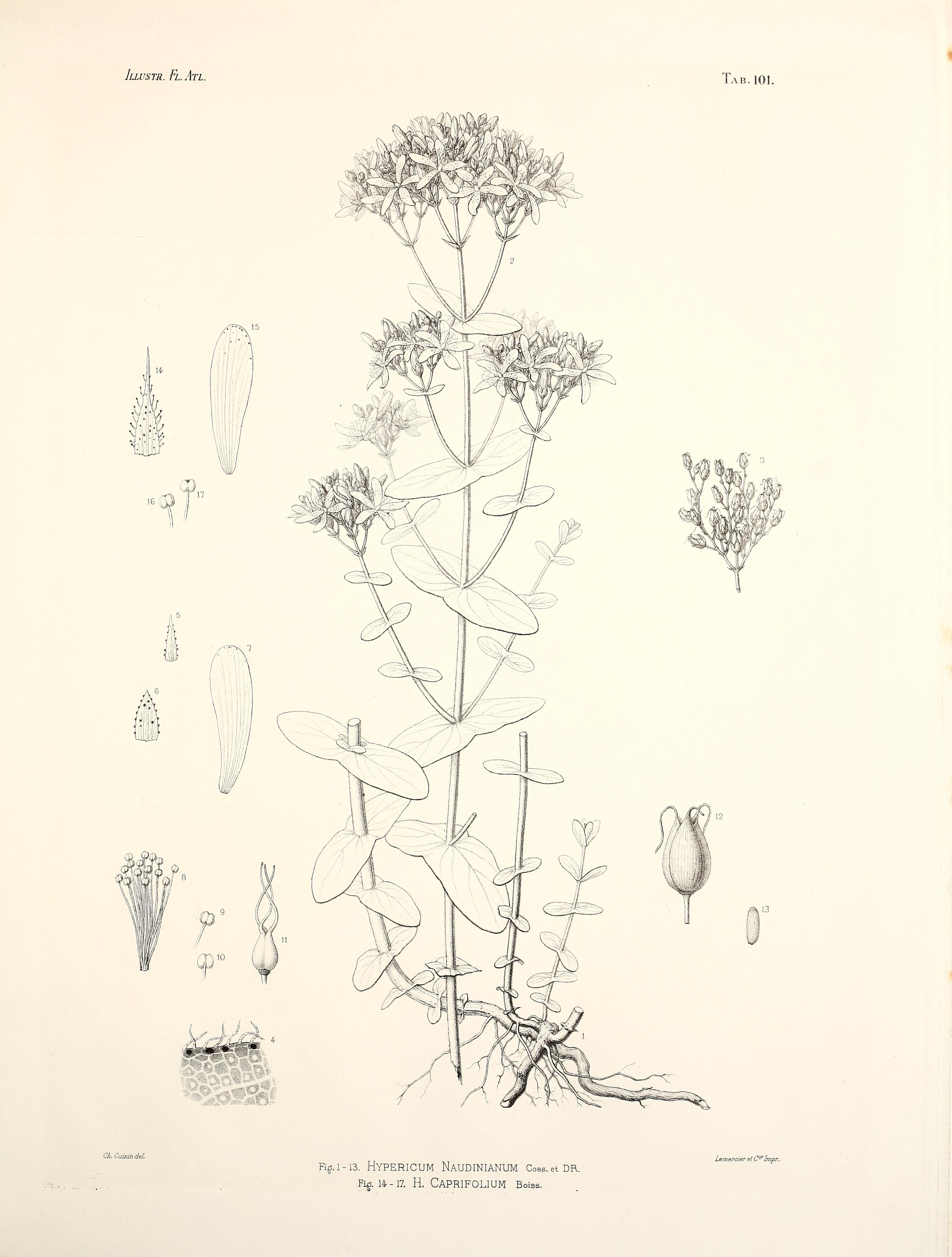
Fig. 14-17 Hypericum caprifolium.
