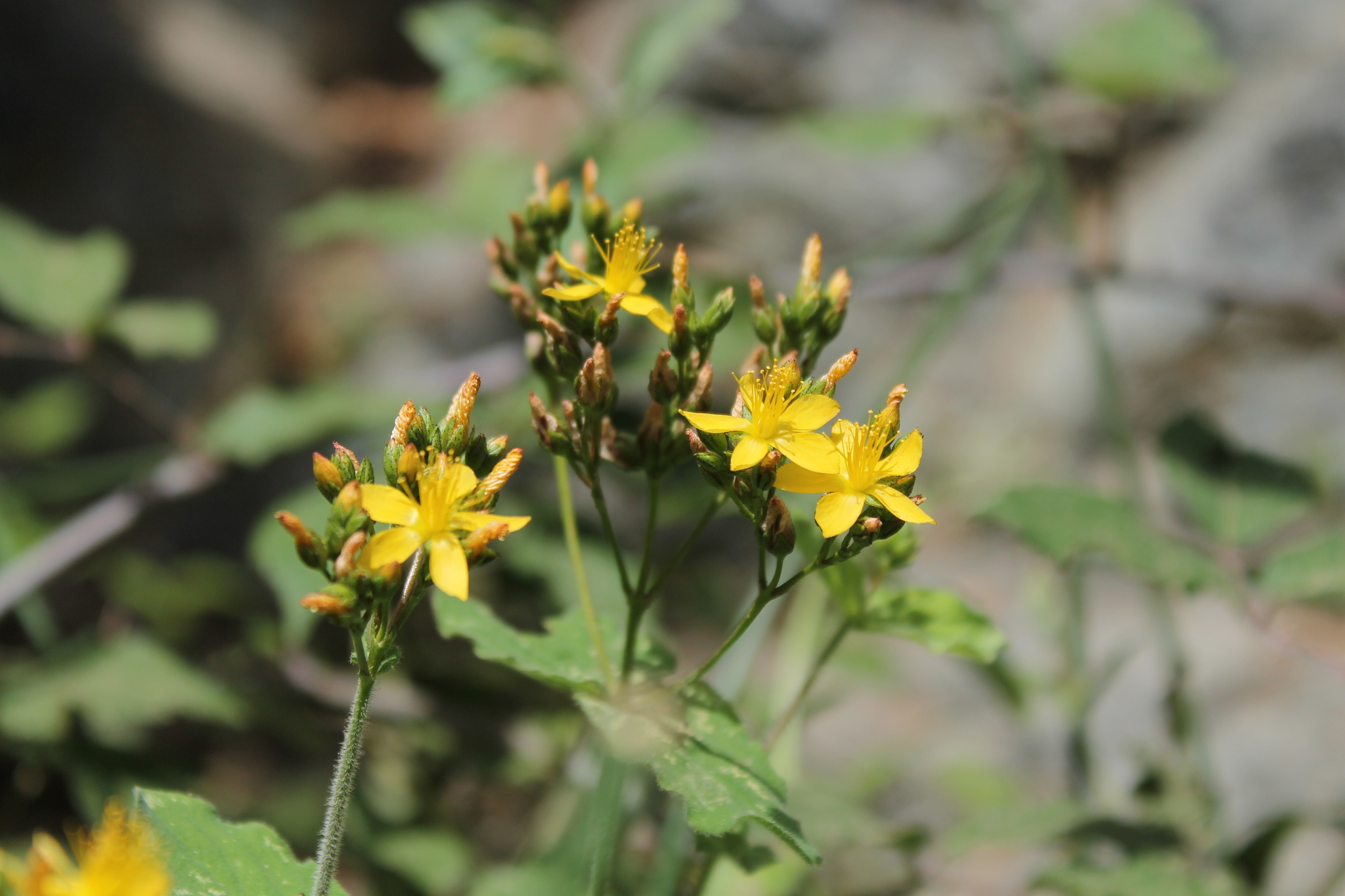

Scientific classification
- Kingdom: Plantae
- Clade: Tracheophytes
- Clade: Angiosperms
- Clade: Eudicots
- Clade: Rosids
- Order: Malpighiales
- Family: Hypericaceae
- Genus: Hypericum
- Section: Hypericum sect. Adenosepalum
- Species: H. naudinianum

Binomial name
- Hypericum naudinianum Coss. & Durieu

Synonyms
- Homotypic Synonyms: Hypericum caprifolium subsp. naudinianum (Coss. & Durieu) Maire; Heterotypic Synonyms: Hypericum atlanticum Coss.; Hypericum coadunatum var. atlanticum Ball

= Hypericum naudinianum =

Species of flowering plant

Hypericum naudinianum is a species of flowering plant in the family Hypericaceae. This perennial herb is in the section Adenosepalum of the genus Hypericum.

== Description ==
The species grows to be 1.5 meters tall. Its stems are reddish brown and its leaves are sessile. It has obtuse flowers that are 15-17mm in diameter. The petals are described as "clear butter yellow" and are veined red.

== Distribution ==
Hypericum naudinianum is found in Algeria and Morocco near streamsides and waterfalls.
