= Hypericum pubescens =

Scientific classification
- Kingdom: Plantae
- Clade: Tracheophytes
- Clade: Angiosperms
- Clade: Eudicots
- Clade: Rosids
- Order: Malpighiales
- Family: Hypericaceae
- Genus: Hypericum
- Section: Hypericum sect. Adenosepalum
- Species: H. pubescens

Binomial name
- Hypericum pubescens Boiss.

Species of flowering plant

Hypericum pubescens is a perennial herb in the Hypericaceae family. It is in the section Adenosepalum.

== Description ==
The species grows from 0.1 to 0.7 metres (3.9 to 28 in) tall. Their stems are green to pale red and their petals are pale to bright yellow.

== Distribution ==
Hypericum pubescens is found in Northern Africa and Spain and Portugal.
