= Norman Robson (botanist) =

English botanist (1928–2021)

- Born: 1928
- Died: 6 September 2021 (aged 92–93)
- Education: Aberdeen University
- Alma mater: University of Edinburgh
- Scientific career
- Fields: Botany
- Institutions: Natural History Museum, London
- Thesis: Studies in the genus Hypericum L. (1956)
- Author abbrev. (botany): N.Robson

Norman Keith Bonner Robson (1928 – 6 September 2021) was a Scientific Associate in the Plants Division, Department of Life Sciences at the Natural History Museum, London. He was a member of staff at the Museum from 1962 to 1988, retiring as Principal Scientific Officer with responsibility for General Herbarium Section I.

Norman produced a worldwide taxonomic monograph of genus Hypericum between 1977 and 2012.

Norman’s interest in Hypericum was stimulated by a final year project on the British species whilst at Aberdeen University. He continued work on the genus for his PhD at the University of Edinburgh (Robson, 1956) with his thesis Studies in the genus Hypericum L., which examined floral anatomy and evolution. At the Royal Botanic Gardens, Kew and subsequently at the Natural History Museum, Norman contributed accounts of Hypericum for flora of various parts of the world. Roy Lancaster encouraged him to start work on a Hypericum monograph in the early 1970s. The monograph, published in a series of papers from 1977 to 2012, was recently completed and accounts for all 490 species of the genus.

Norman published more than 90 papers and flora accounts on Hypericum and described more than 80 new species.

== Bibliography ==
- Robson, Norman K. B. (2007). "Yojiro Kimura's Contribution to the Study of Japanese Hypericum". J. Jpn. Bot. 82 (2): 114. Archived from the original on 2016-03-04.
