= Abraham Moss Community School =

Location
- Crescent Road; Manchester, Greater Manchester, M8 5UF; England; 53°30′42″N 2°14′09″W

Information
- Type: Academy
- Established: 1973
- Founder: Abraham Moss
- Local authority: Manchester
- Trust: The Dean Trust
- Department for Education URN: 150009 Tables
- Ofsted: Reports
- Principal: Josette Arnold
- Gender: Coeducational
- Age: 3 to 16
- Enrolment: 1,848 as of September 2023

Abraham Moss Community School is a coeducational all-through school located on a 19-hectare (47-acre) site situated on Crescent Road in the Crumpsall/Cheetham Hill district of North Manchester adjacent to the Abraham Moss Metrolink station. The complex also includes a leisure centre, the district library and a 230-person theatre complex. The centre also hosts other tenants mainly in the public, voluntary and community sectors. It is named after Abraham Moss, Lord Mayor of Manchester (1953–54).

== History ==
The Abraham Moss opened in 1973 as a multipurpose integrated centre with lower school, and upper school seamlessly joining to a FE college, a library and a leisure centre. The first principal was Ron Mitson, with Dave Shapcott being head of school. It aimed to teach through independent resource-based learning- staff developed and pasted up their own materials which were then taken to the printroom, where the masters were allocated an accession number and the printroom staff would print the required number of copies on offset litho machines. It was referred to as a school without books. The building was featured in a DES best practice building report.

It was one of six such centres built around that time that were characterised by shared-use area, collaboration across phases with an inclusive approach to the pupils, their welfare and developing their potential. They all had innovative curriculums and purpose designed buildings. It was built at a cost of £2.472 m.

Manchester City Libraries moved the stock from Crumpsall Library in 1974. The stock transfer, and subsequent change in the reader profile was subject to a study in 1979 published in the Journal of Librarianship and Information Science. In effect, the number of younger readers increased by 88% but the over 65s stopped coming.

=== Community education ===
Community education, as practised by Cambridgeshire village colleges of the 1930s, was seen as a viable solution for the densely populated long-established communities in areas in need of urban regeneration. Manchester City Council recognised that factors in Cheetham Crumpsall made this area where the experiment could take place. Community Education envisages that the school is the centre of the community, and instead of being closed to all but its pupils, the community should be encouraged. This is done by integrating sports and cultural facilities. Shared use creates financial saving- and the shared identity binds and strengthens the community which eventually takes over the running and management of the facility.

In the case of the Moss, Cheetham Secondary Modern School was due to be rebuilt; following DES Circular 10/65 selection was to be abolished and schools reorganised on comprehensive lines. Rebuilding was included in the 1967–68 and 1968–69 major building programme. Provision for an 800 fte (full-time equivalent) student further education college to be located on Cheetham Hill Road had been approved in 1967, land at Crescent Road would be cheaper and offered further savings if the two were to be in one building. The adult education centre was to move from old buildings adjacent to Cheetham Secondary Modern School to the proposed FE college. It would move too.

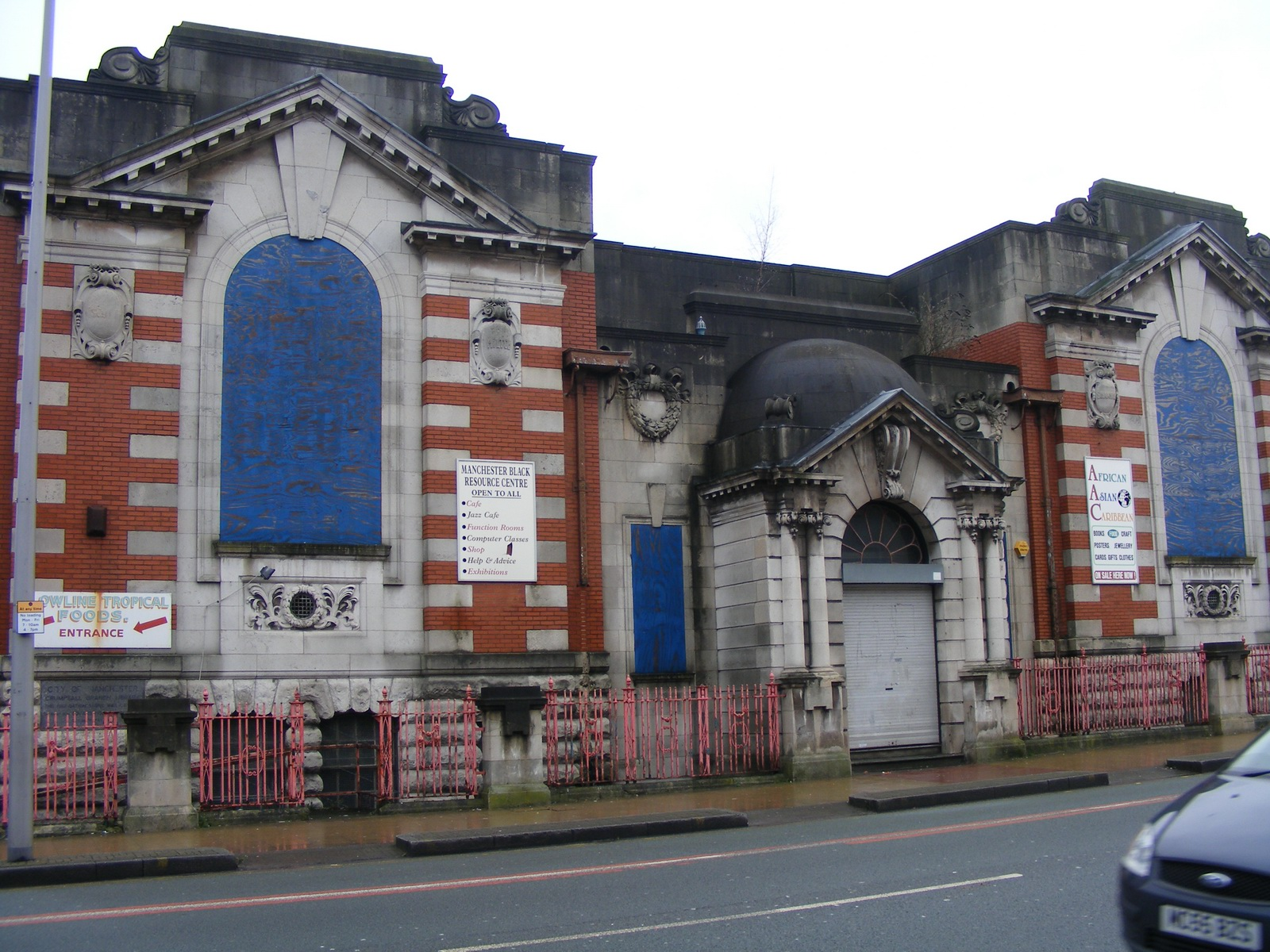
The former library on Cheetham Hill Road

Need had been identified in the area for a youth club, a residential unit for short stay accommodation for children and an elderly and handicapped persons' club with facilities for centralised catering. Providing these in one building was seen as attractive and cost effective.

The existing 19th century public baths on Cheetham Hill Road were due to be closed and replaced with a district sports and recreation centre that would have playing fields, outdoor public recreation space, sports halls and swimming pools. It too was at the early planning stage. Similarly, the Edwardian public library was no longer adequate. On a combined site it could provide the reference materials needed for college and school, and have a full lending library with children section and study space. It would have 60,000 volumes.

Thus, the finance and will to integrate was present, and Manchester was prepared to take the risk.

=== Arson ===
Tackling the blaze

Two of the three school blocks were gutted in an arson attack on Friday, 15 May 1997. This destroyed the buildings, the collected resources and all school records. In spite of this the school reopened in makeshift accommodation in other parts of the centre, the Monday after the weekend. It was thought a group of teenagers, drunk or on drugs were responsible: No-one was charged for the attack. The BBC reported that the blaze, caused five million pounds worth of damage, destroying two-thirds of the school buildings, forty eight classrooms including the drama and music suites.

There was no sprinkler system, and some of the fire barriers in the ceilings had been pierced during alterations to the building. The blaze, one of the biggest seen in Manchester since the Second World War was brought under control by 160 firemen using 30 appliances.

Richard Jobson, Chief Education Officer for Manchester said:

It's a bit like an act of terrorism. There was twenty four hours security here and I haven't heard one single word of criticism from people saying that you didn't do enough. In fact on the contrary we're now fairly well experienced. I mean small fires and vandalism is part of our working life, so we've got used to the notion of making our buildings as secure as possible.

A temporary school of 40 classrooms was constructed out of portacabins on the tennis courts to service the nine hundred staff and pupils.

=== 2012 Expansion ===
There was a large rise in the birth rate in 2008 in Manchester, manifesting in the need for many extra primary school places starting in 2012. Government legislation prevents Manchester City Council from fulfilling it statutory duty by building new schools to accommodate these children, they can only expand existing schools. Twenty seven primary schools were asked to increase their admission numbers by at least 15, and Abraham Moss was asked to change its designation from an 11–16 school to a 5–16 all-through school. The response was favourable, but there are tensions on how some of the existing facilities should be managed, issues such as outdoor play, indoor play and use of the theatre being at dispute. The Moss became an all-through 5–16 school, with a two form primary intake. The first reception class children arrived in September 2012.

The longstanding head teacher David Watchorn had taught at the school since it opened in 1973, and became head in 1984. The 2003 Ofsted report reports:

He has been a force for stability and continuity throughout the school's history, not least when the school "kept going" in the immediate aftermath of the devastating fire of 1997; but he has also grasped the need for change and development and in recent years has helped to fix the staff's attention on the need to raise standards of attainment.

However, despite Watchorn's distinguished and distinctive service to the school and the young people of the area, he was suspended in July 2013 because he publicly disagreed with the City Council about some aspects of the primary school development. Manchester City Council's relationship with its heads has often been stormy and it has a history of suspending headteachers,

Gillian Houghton, a former vice-principal at The Co-operative Academy of Manchester in Blackley was appointed principal.

=== Coronavirus pandemic ===
Due to COVID-19 pandemic in the United Kingdom in March 2020, there has been staff shortages and prolonged self-isolation and the decision was made for a partial school closure to take place for a month. Year 3, Year 4, Year 5, Year 9 and Year 10 pupils have to remain at home for a month, whilst the Early Years, Year 1, Year 6, Year 7, Year 8 and Year 11 still have to attend the school normally. Two days later, the school was later opened to Year 6 and Year 11 only until further notice.

=== Academy ===
Previously a community school administered by Manchester City Council, in September 2023 Abraham Moss Community School converted to academy status. The school is now sponsored by The Dean Trust.

== Site ==
A block plan of the buildings in 1973

The building is on three levels, on falling land, bridging a pedestrian spine, 'the right of way', between Crescent Road and Woodlands Road which is reached through an underpass beneath the Bury line railway. The 9.5 ha of the 13 ha site had been a chemical waste tip, and the remaining 3.5 ha were formerly municipal allotments, to the south of the site the land falls away towards the Irk valley at the time it was informal open space. The southern boundary is defined by the former industrial branch line than led to Crumpsall Vale. The buildings were placed on the former allotment land. This has a high water table, and a subsoil of lenticular glacial drift containing pockets of clay and running sand overlain in part by peat, so this is not very stable. Before landscaping the waste tip was covered with a 6m layer of clean top soil.

=== The 1973 buildings ===
The 1973 building was constructed using the CLASP Mk 4b system. CLASP was a building construction technique introduced post-war and popular in the 1960s for short-term, cheap and easily constructed buildings such as schools,fire stations, libraries etc.

CLASP buildings of wood and concrete panel construction encompass a vast number of hidden voids for services. CLASP Mk 4b was the incarnation used between 1969 and 1972, measurements were imperial using 4" as the basic unit. Panels were multiples of this – that is 12 inches or 1 foot, 3-foot, 6-foot and 9-foot. The planning grid was 12x12 inches, and a structural grid of 36x36 inches. The preferred floor to ceiling heights were 8 ft and 10 ft. The structure was steel frame with a 6 ft bay. It was hung with external 10 ft by 3 ft pre-fabricated concrete panels. The interior partitions were built using plastic-faced, plasterboard-backed steel Stelvelite panels. There was a hung exposed-T ceiling with 36x36 inch mineral tiles. The void above was used for service ducting, heating, electric power and lighting. The system was not heavy which was important due to the difficult sub-soil, and quick to erect which was important due to the tight time scale. It was designed to have a 60-year life. Hindsight shows that the extensive voids were a design fault, and many CLASP buildings have been destroyed by fire and have posed an asbestos risk.

The Moss was designed between 1968 and 1970 by the DES Development Group, the principal architects being David and Mary Medd, Michael Hacker and Ian Fraser. A significant choice as David and Mary Medd have been leading school architects for 40 years. The curriculum was intended to align to the design of the centre. This was envisages as a network of multidisciplinary centres, an idea, that through their work at Maiden Erlegh, springs from a recommendation in the Newsom Report pages 46–48. The 24,000 m² complex was a low and compact 3-storey CLASP network, lit by small courtyards with 25 dispersed entrances linked by high level footbridges with an 'internal street'. Each component still had to satisfy multiple design regulations. The lower school was designed to provide a sheltered and identifiable environment for younger pupils (Year 7–Year 8). There were four centres or bases for smaller groups of 120 pupils and their five principal teachers who worked in a team to deliver resource based multidisciplinary project based work. The bays were 90% self-sufficient, and the lower school had its own hall and dining area with pullman style bays to further satisfy design requirements and shelter the pupils.

=== Arson damage ===
Two of the three school blocks were gutted in an arson attack on Friday, 15 May 1997. This destroyed the buildings, the collected resources and all school records. There was no sprinkler system, and some of the fire barriers in the ceilings had been pierced during alterations to the building.

A temporary school of 40 classrooms was constructed out of portacabins on the tennis courts to service the nine hundred staff and pupils. The BBC reported that the blaze caused five million pounds worth of damage, destroying two-thirds of the school buildings, forty eight classrooms including the drama and music suites. The Guardian reported the cost was eight million.

=== 2012 buildings ===
There are tensions on how some of the existing facilities should be managed, issues such as outdoor play, indoor play and use of the theatre being at dispute. It is hoped to move the library from within the main-centre to a site within the leisure centre allowing the remaining CLASP 4b cladding to be replaced. It will have a separate entrance. The library and the primary school both wish to claim some key areas.

=== Current facilities ===
It comprises a school, an adult learning centre (City College), a library, a professional recording studio. The large leisure centre has extensive facilities including an IsoSpa gym, a sauna, two swimming pools, squash courts and a number of large halls for a variety of sports activities.

== Admissions ==
There are formal procedures for entry at 3 years, and for entry at 11 years. The Abraham Moss follows the Manchester Education Committee admissions and appeals system. For Year seven, the applications are made the preceding October. The school has raised its admissions number from 240 to 270, but still predicts that it will be over subscribed.

== Curriculum ==
The secondary school operates a two-week 46 period timetable.

=== Key Stage 3 ===
All pupils in state funded community schools are required to follow the National Curriculum that was recently revised in 2014. To fulfil this requirement, pupils in Year 7 and Year 8 study:

Subject	Hours	Class Size
English	7	23
Maths	7	23
Science	6	23
ICT/Computing	2	23
Art	3	23
Music	2	23
Drama	2	23
PE	2	23
Geography	3	23
Language	6	23
History	3	23
Religious Studies	2	23
Design Technology	3	23

=== Key Stage 4 ===
All pupils in state funded community schools are required to follow the National Curriculum that was recently revised in 2014. To fulfill this requirement, pupils in Year 10, and Year 11 study for GCSE and BTEC qualifications. All students study a common core of subjects that comprises English, English Literature, Mathematics, Science and Religious Studies. In addition to these subjects most will study 3 optional subjects, as well as Physical Education. In Year 11 PE is dropped and the students are banded, so the weaker students can spend more time on the essential core, and the more academic can study a further option.

== Academic performance ==
The 2011 Ofsted Inspection reported

"Students' attainment overall in GCSE examinations has improved year-on-year although it remains consistently below the national average. Low levels of attainment overall are affected by the intake of high numbers of students, often at different times of the year, with little or no knowledge of English" ...

... "From 2008 to 2010 progress in English and mathematics was significantly above the national average. Students of African heritage make outstanding progress overall and those who speak English as an additional language make outstanding progress in English."

== Head teachers ==
- Ron Mitson
- Dave Shapcott
- Ann Porteous
- David Watchorn
- Gill Houghton
- Andy Shakos (Interim)
- Josette Arnold (Head of School)

== Notable former pupils ==
- Hassan Butt
- Abdullah Afzal
- Carl Austin-Behan
- Kieran Morrison

== See also ==
- Sidney Stringer Academy

== Notes ==
=== References ===
- Building Bulletin 49 (1973). Abraham Moss Centre, Manchester (Building Bulletin 49) (Paperback). Dept.of Education & Science. ISBN 978-0-11-270345-7.
- Fletcher, Colin; Thompson, Neil; Mitson, Ron (1980). Issues in Community Education. Politics and Education. Lewes, Sussex: Falmer Press. pp. 101–114. ISBN 0-905273-08-7.
- Franklin, Geraint; Harwood, Elaine; Taylor, Simon Whitfield (2012). England's Schools, A Thematic Study (PDF). Research Report Series. Vol. 33–2012. English Heritage. ISSN 2046-9799. OCLC 1064226075. Archived from the original (PDF) on 6 November 2013.
