= Inner London Education Authority =

Former education authority in London

- Logo

- Boroughs within the Inner London Education Authority Area
- Abbreviation: ILEA
- Predecessor: London County Council
- Successor: 12 Inner London borough councils and the City of London Corporation
- Formation: 1 April 1965
- Founded: London Government Act 1963
- Dissolved: 1 April 1990
- Type: Local education authority
- Legal status: Special committee (1965–1986); Body corporate (1986–1990)
- Headquarters: London County Hall
- Location: Lambeth, Greater London
- Region served: Inner London
- Members: 58 directly elected members (1986–1990)
- Parent organisation: Greater London Council (1965–1986)

The Inner London Education Authority (ILEA) was the local education authority for the City of London and the 12 Inner London boroughs from 1965 until its abolition in 1990. From 1965 to 1986 it was an ad hoc committee of the Greater London Council; on 1 April 1986 it was reconstituted as a directly elected body corporate.

== History ==
The Inner London Education Authority was established when the Greater London Council (GLC) replaced the London County Council (LCC) as the principal local authority for London in 1965. The LCC had, in 1904, taken over from the London School Board responsibility for education in Inner London. In what was to become Outer London, education was during the first half of the twentieth century primarily administered by the relevant county councils and county boroughs, with some functions delegated to second-tier councils in the area.

The Herbert Commission report in 1960 recommended the establishment of the Greater London Council. It advocated a London-wide division of educational powers between the GLC and the London boroughs. The GLC would be responsible for strategic control of schools, and the boroughs for routine management. This part of the report was rejected by the government. Councils in the future Outer London area wanted greater control over education, preventing the creation of a London-wide local education authority (LEA), and there was strong opposition from teachers and other bodies to the idea of dividing up the LCC LEA. The London Government Act 1963 therefore created the ILEA to inherit the educational responsibilities of the LCC, and gave Outer London boroughs LEA status. The ILEA was originally conceived as a provisional body whose status would be reviewed before 1970, but the Labour government made its status permanent in 1965.

The ILEA did not cover the small area of North Woolwich, where the LCC had provided a secondary school. This part of the County of London was transferred to the new London Borough of Newham in Outer London and Newham Council was therefore an education authority.

The ILEA had a somewhat anomalous legal status. Technically the GLC itself was the education authority for inner London, but it was both administratively difficult and politically questionable to allow outer London members of the GLC to have an input. Therefore, the GLC delegated responsibility to the ILEA as a 'special committee', consisting of the members of the GLC from the Inner London area, plus one member delegated from each of the inner London boroughs and the City of London. Those who were members of both the GLC and the ILEA tended to concentrate on one duty only, although they attended the meetings of both bodies.

== Political composition ==
It was possible for the ILEA to have a majority of Labour members when the GLC had a majority of Conservative members, and this happened from 1970 to 1973 and 1977 to 1981. In addition, most of the important decisions taken by the ILEA were taken by its Education Committee, on which every member sat. The Education Committee could also co-opt members with experience of education, some of them representing the teaching unions.

The initial composition of the ILEA in 1964 was 43 Labour members to 9 Conservatives, with one Independent. After the 1967 election the Conservatives won a majority, and Christopher Chataway became Leader. However, Labour won control in 1970 and Ashley Bramall began his long leadership. His term saw the ILEA go over to comprehensive education, and the abolition of school corporal punishment. He retained power despite the Conservative election victory in the 1977 GLC elections.

When the Left, under Ken Livingstone, won control of the GLC after the 1981 elections, Bramall lost his position in an internal Labour Party vote, being replaced by Bryn Davies. Livingstone later expressed regret for this decision and expressed his admiration for Bramall's leadership abilities. The remaining years of the ILEA saw a succession of left-wing leaderships, none of which lasted long or established a strong reputation. Frances Morrell, formerly an assistant to Tony Benn, led a feminist ILEA from 1983 to 1987 which threatened to defy its rate-capping in November 1984, before Neil Fletcher took over.

== List of leaders ==
The ILEA was formally created in 1964 and began operations in 1965, but the post of Leader did not exist until April 1967. For the period 1964–67, the de facto leadership was shared between the Chairman of the Education Committee, James Young, and the Chairmen of the Authority, Harold Shearman (1964–1965) and Ashley Bramall (1965–1967). From 1967, the Leaders of the ILEA were:

- Christopher Chataway 1967–1969
- Lena Townsend 1969–1970
- Ashley Bramall 1970–1981
- Bryn Davies 1981–1983
- Frances Morrell 1983–1987
- Neil Fletcher 1987–1990

== Additional functions ==
The ILEA had its own schools broadcasting service, the Educational Television Service, based in the former Tennyson Secondary School, Thackeray Road, SW8. The television centre had two functional television studios, a training studio, a master control and sound and vision mixing suites. At one stage this was believed to be the largest closed-circuit television system in the world. The first transmission took place on 16 September 1969 and the Television Service ran until 1977. When the Post Office, whose cabling was used for the distribution, wanted to withdraw from its contract in the late 1970s, the programming was transferred to VHS tapes and the CCTV network closed down.

The Cockpit Theatre, Marylebone (also known at the Cockpit Youth and Arts Centre), in Gateforth Street, London, NW8, was built for the ILEA on the edge of the Lisson Green estate in 1969–70. It was designed as a Theatre in the round by Edward Mendelsohn. The ILEA created the first Theatre in Education company to be entirely housed within a local education authority. It employed seven actor-teachers and a stage manager and focused its work on secondary schools and Further Education. As well as traditional T.I.E. the Cockpit team used the approach to develop shows analysing set texts. When ILEA was abolished in 1990, ownership of the theatre transferred to the London Borough of Westminster.

The ILEA had a planetarium, based at Wandsworth School. It was opened by the Astronomer Royal Sir Richard Woolley on 19 May 1966.

The ILEA also ran a watersports centre at Greenland Dock in Bermondsey, and the Centre For Life Studies, a training centre for biologists in secondary education, at London Zoo; and funded the zoological collections Horniman Museum in Forest Hill, south London, and the Geffrye Museum, now the Museum of the Home, in Hoxton.

The ILEA also had its own boarding school at Wolverstone Hall, near Ipswich in Suffolk.

== Reconstitution ==
The ILEA was reformed by the Local Government Act 1985 which reconstituted it as a standalone body corporate and a directly elected authority. The replacement body came into existence before the abolition of the special committee of the GLC and was known as the Inner London Interim Education Authority until it came into its powers on 1 April 1986.

In the May 1986 elections, each Inner London Parliamentary constituency elected two members of the ILEA. Labour won easily.

== Abolition ==
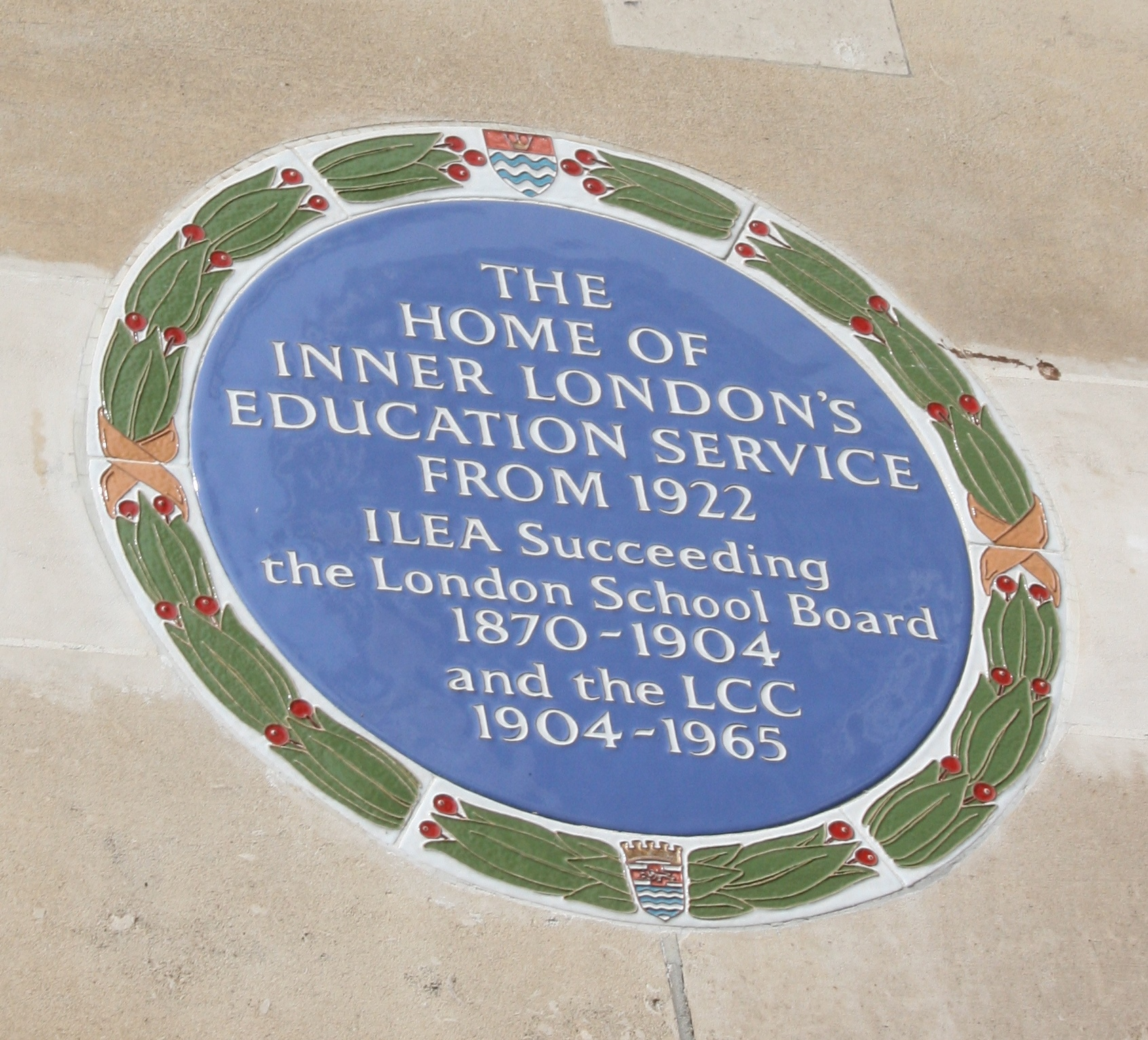
Plaque on London County Hall

The ILEA had fought off one attempt to abolish it in 1980. The abolition of the GLC, announced in 1983, led to another attempt to get rid of the ILEA, but the Inner London Boroughs were adjudged not ready to handle education services. The Conservative government was led by Margaret Thatcher, who had grown to dislike the ILEA as over-spending and over-bureaucratic while Education Secretary in the early 1970s, and would have liked to abolish it.

Backbench Conservative MPs continued to oppose the continuation of the ILEA. The Education Reform Bill of Kenneth Baker proposed to allow Boroughs who wanted to opt out of the ILEA and become education authorities. However, the Government's hand was forced when an amendment was tabled in the House of Commons by Norman Tebbit and supported by Michael Heseltine to abolish the ILEA altogether. This unlikely alliance was particularly notable as Tebbit and Heseltine represented very different ideological wings of the Conservative Party. It was also the source of some local controversy at the time, as both members represented constituencies (Chingford and Henley respectively) outside the ILEA area.

The Government announced on 4 February 1988 that it would accept the Tebbit/Heseltine amendment and abolish the ILEA in 1990 as part of the Education Reform Act 1988. Once the Bill was passed, the ILEA then complied with this decision in the interests of education. The Inner London boroughs then became education authorities, and remain so today.

The abolition of the ILEA meant that Inner London boroughs had to, among other things, establish their own admissions policies. This indirectly impacted school admissions across the country, because the Greenwich judgment of 1989 established that LEAs could no longer give their own residents priority access to schools.

== Collections ==
The London Archives holds the records of the ILEA from its conception until its closure in 1990; further material for the archive was received in 2004 and 2005.

The Institute of Education, University College London holds extensive material relating to groups and individuals involved in work for the ILEA. These include:

- Papers of Gene Adams (museum educator)
- Papers of Marina Foster (ILEA teacher and activist)
- Papers of Brenda Francis (ILEA teacher)
- Papers of Trevor Jaggar (educator and ILEA schools inspector)
- Papers of Martin Lightfoot (director of Penguin Education and education textbook reformer)
- Papers of David Medd and Mary Medd (educational architects)
- Papers of Professor Kate Myers (education academic who undertook research for ILEA)
- Papers of Cynthia Reynolds (ILEA teacher)
- Photographic Archive of the Architects and Building Branch, Ministry of Education
- Records of the ALPAG (All London Parents Action Group) and Parents Initiative (campaigning organisations)
- Records of the Records of the ILEA Bridging Course (officially known as the ILEA/EEC Transition from School to Work Project)
- Records of the London Parents' Ballot Campaign (which campaigned to stop the closure of ILEA)

The Institute of Education also holds a library of books and publications which was transferred from the ILEA Learning Resources Branch following its closure in 1990.

== See also ==
- Governance of Greater London (1986–2000)
