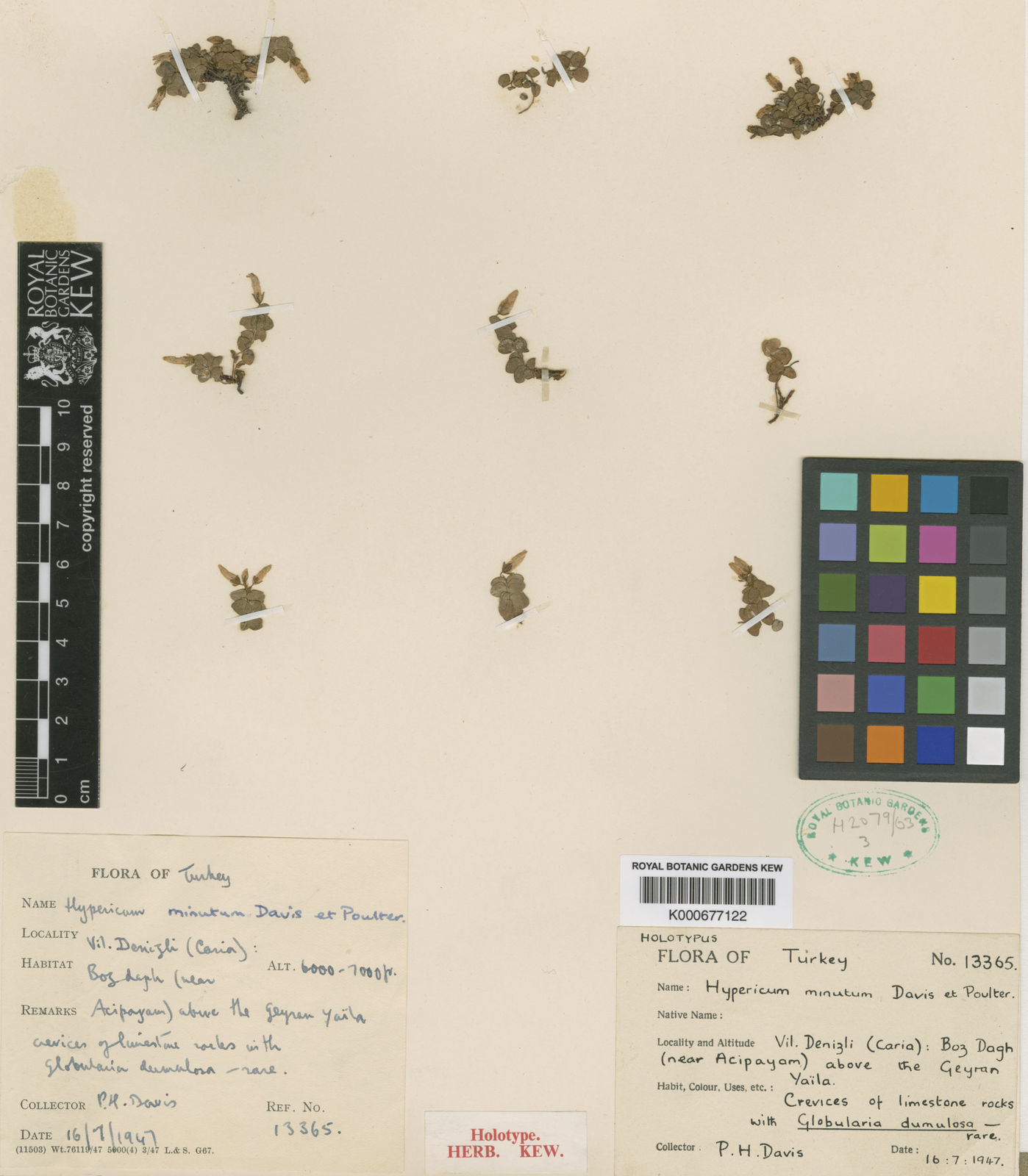
- Holotype specimen of Hypericum minutum

Conservation status
- Endangered (IUCN 2.3)

Scientific classification
- Kingdom: Plantae
- Clade: Tracheophytes
- Clade: Angiosperms
- Clade: Eudicots
- Clade: Rosids
- Order: Malpighiales
- Family: Hypericaceae
- Genus: Hypericum
- Section: Hypericum sect. Adenosepalum
- Species: H. minutum

Binomial name
- Hypericum minutum P.H.Davis & Poulter

= Hypericum minutum =

Species of plant in the St John's wort family

Hypericum minutum is a species of flowering plant in the St John's wort family Hypericaceae. It is a small perennial herb that grows in tufts. It has slender and brittle stems, flowers in clusters of one to three, yellow petals with black and amber glands, few stamens, and a seed capsule with narrow grooves. H. minutum is closely related to H. huber-morathii and H. sechmenii and resembles a smaller form of the latter plant. The plant is endemic to Turkey, and is found among limestone rocks in a limited region of southwestern Anatolia. Originally excluded from a comprehensive monograph of Hypericum, the species' placement within the genus is unclear. It has been placed in both section Adenosepalum and section Origanifolium.

== Etymology ==
The genus name Hypericum is possibly derived from the Greek words hyper (above) and eikon (picture), in reference to the tradition of hanging the plant over religious icons in the home. The species name minutum comes from the Latin word minutus, and means small or minute. In Turkish, the plant is called minik kantaronu, which translates to little St. John's wort.

== Description ==
Hypericum minutum is a small perennial herb that grows 1.5–2.5 centimeters (0.59–0.98 in) tall. It is entirely hairless, and it grows in tufts of stems that ascend from a central taproot. Its stems are slender with a two-lined cross section on the higher parts of the plant, and a more circular one on the lower parts. They are brittle and lack glands. The leaf stalk is 0.05 cm long, and the leaf blade is 0.45 cm long by 0.4 cm wide. The leaf ranges in shape from a wide oval to almost circular, with a blunt or rounded tip and a blunt or somewhat heart-shaped base. There are one or two pairs of lateral veins that ascend near the base of the leaf. There are very few pale and black glands on the surface of the leaf, but on its edges there are many black glands.

The flowers are usually clustered in groups of one to three. The bracts are small and have tooth-like edges, and the flowers are around 0.7–0.8 cm wide. The sepals are of varying sizes and are not fused together. The petals are yellow without any tint of red, and are 0.4–0.7 cm long and 0.1–0.2 cm wide. They have varying amounts of amber glands on their surface as well as black glands on their edges. There are a few stamens, the longest of which are around 0.4–0.5 cm. The styles are around 0.1 cm long and the seed capsule is around 0.3 cm long and 0.2 cm wide. It is an ellipsoid shape and the valves have narrow vittae, or oil tubes. The pollen has three pores, each within one of three colpi, or grooves, on the grain. The surface of the grain is rough, and it is the shape of a prolate sphere.

Hypericum minutum can be told apart from its closest relatives, H. sechmenii and H. huber-morathii, by several characteristics. These include its shorter stems, fewer flowers per cluster, bracts with tooth-like edges, many amber glands on the petals, and later flowering time in July. In general, it resembles a smaller form of H. sechmenii.

== Taxonomy ==
The species was first described as Hypericum minutum by Peter Hadland Davis and Barbara Poulter in 1954 in the journal Notes from the Royal Botanic Garden, Edinburgh. It was originally excluded in error from a comprehensive monograph of the genus Hypericum by Norman Robson, along with the related species H. formosissimum and H. huber-morathii. A later edition of the monograph corrected the mistake and discussed the morphology and relationships of H. minutum. However, it introduced ambiguity as to which section of Hypericum the species belonged. Robson acknowledged that it and the two other excluded species should have been included in his treatment of sect. Adenosepalum, but then advocated for their inclusion in sect. Origanifolia based on the structure of their vittae, which would relate them most closely to Hypericum aviculariifolium in the latter section. According to Robson, removing the three species, along with several others related to Hypericum elodeoides, would lead to a "purified" sect. Adenosepalum forming a "natural group" of species.

Further complicating the contradiction was the species' later inclusion by Norman Robson and his colleague David Pattinson within a "Huber-morathii group" inside sect. Adenosepalum in the online edition of the monograph in 2013. Under that classification, the placement of Hypericum minutum was summarized as follows:

Hypericum

Hypericum subg. Hypericum

Hypericum sect. Adenosepalum

Huber-Morathii Group

H. decaisneanum - H. formosissimum - H. huber-morathii - H. minutum - H. sechmenii

The name was accepted again in 2010 in a cladistic analysis of the genus, and in a review of the taxonomy of Hypericum by Robson and Sara Crockett in 2011, though no clarification was given as to its classification within the genus in either report.

== Distribution, habitat, and ecology ==
The village of Bozdağ, which is the type locality for Hypericum minutum

Hypericum minutum is one of eight species of Hypericum sect. Adenosepalum that are native to Turkey. Its holotype was collected outside the village of Bozdağ in the direction of Acıpayam, in the coastal Aegean region of Anatolia. The species is rare, and can be found in the crevices of limestone rocks at altitudes of 1,800–2,000 meters (5,900–6,600 ft), where it grows alongside Globularia dumulosa, a small shrub that is also endemic to southwestern Anatolia.

Propagation of Hypericum minutum is undertaken by planting seeds in the spring, barely covering them in soil. They are then allowed to germinate for 1–3 months at a temperature of 10–16 °C (50–61 °F). The plants grow best in sunny, dry rock crevices with protection from winter dampness. Division is done in the spring, while cuttings are taken in the late summer.

Hypericum minutum was listed as a rare species globally and in Turkey by the 1997 IUCN Red List. A 2011 review of Turkish Hypericum species reported it as endemic to the country, and labelled it as an endangered species according to the IUCN's rating system.
