= 1986 Inner London Education Authority election =

- 8 May 1986

58 members of the Inner London Education Authority 29 seats needed for a majority
	First party	Second party	Third party
Party	Labour	Conservative	Alliance
Seats won	45	11	2
Popular vote	664,520	427,826	300,680
Percentage	47.2%	30.4%	21.4%
- Results by parliamentary constituency.
ILEA control before election
New body
Elected ILEA control
Labour Party (UK)

The 1986 Inner London Education Authority election was held on 8 May in order to elect members to the Inner London Education Authority (ILEA).

Before 1986, members of the ILEA had been co-opted mainly from the Greater London Council (GLC), but also co-opted from the boroughs and the City of London. The Greater London Council was abolished in 1986 at the time of the 1986 ILEA election. This was the only direct election to the ILEA, which was abolished in 1990.

== Context ==
The ILEA had been established in 1965 to assume educational responsibilities for the area of the 12 boroughs and the City of London which formed the former London County Council.

Originally, the ILEA was a special committee of the GLC. In this iteration, it was made up of co-opted members of the GLC who represented Inner London areas, together with one representative co-opted from each of the 13 individual Inner London authorities.

The abolition of the Greater London Council under the Local Government Act 1985 led to the re-establishment of the ILEA as an elected body in its own right with 58 members. Collectively, the individual Inner London authorities were deemed not to be ready to manage educational responsibilities. Transferring its powers to the boroughs and the City of London or re-establishing it as a joint board of the boroughs were also considered.

Constituents of each of the 29 parliamentary seats of Inner London (at the time) elected two members - in total there were 58 members. There were two by-elections to the ILEA, in 1987 in Streatham, and in 1988 in Southwark and Bermondsey.

The Education Reform Act 1988 abolished the re-established ILEA, transferring its powers to the boroughs and the City of London. Initially the government had intended to establish a system where individual boroughs or the City of London could opt out of the ILEA, but eventually decided against this due to pressure from Conservative backbenchers.

== Results ==
Party	Votes		Seats	
Party	Number	%	Seats	%
Labour	664,520	47.2	45	77.6
Conservative	427,826	30.4	11	19.0
Alliance	300,680	21.4	2	3.4
Green	7,155	0.5	0	
Independent	2,306	0.2	0	
Independent Labour	1,714	0.1	0	
Communist	1,654	0.1	0	
Reform London Schools	710	0.1	0	
National Front	425	0.0	0	
Humanist	322	0.0	0	
Total	1,407,312	100.0	58	

Electorate: 1,728,604. Turnout: 44.2%.

== Members ==
Name	Constituency	Party	Term
David Avery	City of London and Westminster South	Conservative	1986-1990
Peter Aylmer	Bethnal Green and Stepney	Labour	1986-1990
Hilary Barnard	Lewisham East	Labour	1986-1990
Stephen Benn	Hackney North and Stoke Newington	Labour	1986-1990
Ann Bernadt	Dulwich	Labour	1986-1990
Gwendoline Bernard	Bethnal Green and Stepney	Labour	1986-1990
Doreen Bigwood	Greenwich	Labour	1986-1990
Lorna Boreland	Norwood	Labour	1986-1990
Dominic Brennan	Southwark and Bermondsey	Social Democratic	1986-1990
Clive Brown	Southwark and Bermondsey	Liberal	1986-1988
Steve Bundred	Islington North	Labour	1986-1990
John M. Bynner	Hampstead and Highgate	Labour	1986-1990
Margaret Calcott-James	Putney	Conservative	1986-1990
John Carr	Lewisham West	Labour	1986-1990
R. E. Colley	Southwark and Bermondsey	Social and Liberal Democrat	1988-1990
Steven Cowan	Westminster North	Labour	1986-1990
Lincoln Crawford	Tooting	Labour	1986-1990
Irma Critchlow	Vauxhall	Labour	1986-1990
Paul Flather	Tooting	Labour	1986-1990
Neil Fletcher	Holborn and St Pancras	Labour	1986-1990
Dudley Fox	Chelsea	Conservative	1986-1990
Ashrath Francis	Eltham	Labour	1986-1990
Martin Garman	Lewisham Deptford	Labour	1986-1990
Barbara Garnett	Putney	Conservative	1986-1990
Barbara Grahame	Westminster North	Labour	1986-1990
Muriel Gumbel	Streatham	Conservative	1986-1987
Lesley Hammond	Norwood	Labour	1986-1990
Belle Harris	Bow and Poplar	Labour	1986-1990
Muriel Hooker	Islington South and Finsbury	Labour	1986-1990
Elsie Horstead	Hackney South and Shoreditch	Labour	1986-1990
Daphne Johnson	Lewisham West	Conservative	1986-1990
Margaret Jones	Battersea	Labour	1986-1990
M. D. Leigh	Streatham	Conservative	1987-1990
Bryan Levitt	Kensington	Conservative	1986-1990
Jennifer Litherland	Hammersmith	Labour	1986-1990
John Lucas	Battersea	Labour	1986-1990
John Mann	Peckham	Labour	1986-1990
Hilda McCafferty	Hammersmith	Labour	1986-1990
Elizabeth Monck	Holborn and St Pancras	Labour	1986-1990
Frances Morrell	Islington South and Finsbury	Labour	1986-1990
Jameson Mthethwa	Peckham	Labour	1986-1990
Rosemary Nicholson	Islington North	Labour	1986-1990
Eric Ollerenshaw	Kensington	Conservative	1986-1990
John O'Malley	Vauxhall	Labour	1986-1990
Myra Polya	Hampstead and Highgate	Labour	1986-1990
Anthony Powell	Fulham	Labour	1986-1990
Anstey Rice	Lewisham East	Labour	1986-1990
Margaret Ridell	Streatham	Conservative	1986-1990
Kathryn Riley	Woolwich	Labour	1986-1990
Martin Rogers	Eltham	Labour	1986-1990
Charles Rossi	Lewisham Deptford	Labour	1986-1990
Herbert Sandford	Chelsea	Conservative	1986-1990
Barrington Stead	Fulham	Labour	1986-1990
Katherine Tracey	City of London and Westminster South	Conservative	1986-1990
Lloyd Trott	Dulwich	Labour	1986-1990
Dennis Twomey	Bow and Poplar	Labour	1986-1990
June Ward	Hackney South and Shoreditch	Labour	1986-1990
Peter Willsman	Woolwich	Labour	1986-1990
Bernard Wiltshire	Hackney North and Stoke Newington	Labour	1986-1990
Deirdre Wood	Greenwich	Labour	1986-1990

== Constituency results ==
=== Camden ===
Hampstead and Highgate (2 seats)
Party	Candidate	Votes	%	±%
Labour	John M Bynner	12,177		N/A
Labour	Myra C Polya	11,848		N/A
Conservative	Doreen Miller	9,621		N/A
Conservative	David GFAX Soskin	9,527		N/A
SDP	Anne Sofer	7,795		N/A
Alliance	Felicity Taylor	6,530		N/A
Rejected ballots		460		
Turnout		57,498	91.6	N/A
Registered electors		62,743		N/A
Labour win (new seat)				
Labour win (new seat)				

Holborn and St Pancras (2 seats)
Party	Candidate	Votes	%	±%
Labour	Peter Neil Fletcher	16,958		N/A
Labour	Elizabeth M Monck	16,622		N/A
Conservative	Olga H Maitland	6,634		N/A
Conservative	Peter J Skolar	6,267		N/A
SDP	Elizabeth Blundell	5,757		N/A
Alliance	Paul WL Sample	5,176		N/A
Rejected ballots		538		
Turnout		57,414	82.1	N/A
Registered electors		69,968		N/A
Labour win (new seat)				
Labour win (new seat)				

=== Greenwich ===
Eltham (2 seats)
Party	Candidate	Votes	%	±%
Labour	Ashrath R Francis	10,865		N/A
Labour	Martin J. Rogers	10,457		N/A
Conservative	Helen Gardener	10,071		N/A
Conservative	Derek M. Richards	9,699		N/A
Alliance	Edward J Randall	5,859		N/A
Alliance	Peter J Churchill	5,743		N/A
Rejected ballots		473		
Turnout		52,694	97.6	N/A
Registered electors		53,978		N/A
Labour win (new seat)				
Labour win (new seat)				

Greenwich (2 seats)
Party	Candidate	Votes	%	±%
Labour	Doreen J Bigwood	11,657		N/A
Labour	Deirdre FM Wood	10,893		N/A
Conservative	Robin Henderson	6,233		N/A
Conservative	Jeremy B Wise	6,065		N/A
SDP	Vivienne W Stone	4,737		N/A
SDP	Ronald S. Benns	4,622		N/A
Independent	Ronald S. Mallone	620		N/A
Rejected ballots		344		
Turnout		44,827	88.3	N/A
Registered electors		50,759		N/A
Labour win (new seat)				
Labour win (new seat)				

Woolwich (2 seats)
Party	Candidate	Votes	%	±%
Labour	Kathryn A Riley	11,796		N/A
Labour	Peter Rupert William Willsman	11,699		N/A
SDP	Rosemary S Bames	8,257		N/A
SDP	Michael V Slavin	7,955		N/A
Conservative	Vivienne W Stone	3,745		N/A
Conservative	Ronald S. Benns	3,710		N/A
Rejected ballots		382		
Turnout		47,162	81.5	N/A
Registered electors		57,863		N/A
Labour win (new seat)				
Labour win (new seat)				

=== Hackney ===
Hackney North and Stoke Newington (2 seats)
Party	Candidate	Votes	%	±%
Labour	Stephen Benn	1,411		N/A
Labour	Bernard Wiltshire	13,157		N/A
Conservative	Stephen EP Govier	5,003		N/A
Conservative	Mary Touchard	4,868		N/A
SDP	Ian W Byrne	3,397		N/A
SDP	Louise J Baird	3,387		N/A
Communist	Andreas Michaelides	851		N/A
Rejected ballots		675		
Turnout		44,774	68.0	N/A
Registered electors		65,876		N/A
Labour win (new seat)				
Labour win (new seat)				

Hackney South and Shoreditch (2 seats)
Party	Candidate	Votes	%	±%
Labour	Elsie H Horstead	11,592		N/A
Labour	June R Ward	11,336		N/A
Alliance	Andrew J Bridgwater	6,765		N/A
Alliance	Sylvia R Anderson	6,547		N/A
Conservative	Marc-Henri C Glendening	3,789		N/A
Conservative	Geoffrey M Lenox-Smith	3,765		N/A
Rejected ballots		511		
Turnout		43,794	62.1	N/A
Registered electors		70,539		N/A
Labour win (new seat)				
Labour win (new seat)				

=== Hammersmith and Fulham ===
Fulham (2 seats)
Party	Candidate	Votes	%	±%
Labour	Anthony FW Powell	13,526		N/A
Labour	Barrington J Stead	13,205		N/A
Conservative	Giles B Chichester	10,443		N/A
Conservative	Charles KM Taylor	10,080		N/A
SDP	Elsie Lloyd-Jones	2,738		N/A
Alliance	Geoffrey M Lenox-Smith	2,666		N/A
Rejected ballots		285		
Turnout		52,658	98.0	N/A
Registered electors		53,751		N/A
Labour win (new seat)				
Labour win (new seat)				

Hammersmith (2 seats)
Party	Candidate	Votes	%	±%
Labour	Hilda McCafferty	12,257		N/A
Labour	Jennifer M Litherland	12,193		N/A
Conservative	John A Hennessy	6,675		N/A
Conservative	William C Smith	6,174		N/A
SDP	Elsie Lloyd-Jones	3,657		N/A
Alliance	Angela T Davies	3,474		N/A
Rejected ballots		696		
Turnout		44,430	90.6	N/A
Registered electors		49,056		N/A
Labour win (new seat)				
Labour win (new seat)				

=== Islington ===
Islington North (2 seats)
Party	Candidate	Votes	%	±%
Labour	Stephen Bundred	14,534		N/A
Labour	Rosemary A Nicholson	14,339		N/A
SDP	Anthony BT Davey	6,319		N/A
Alliance	Sarah A Ludford	6,138		N/A
Conservative	Kenneth EJ Graham	4,291		N/A
Conservative	Kingsley G Manning	4,007		N/A
Rejected ballots		663		
Turnout		49,628	82.6	N/A
Registered electors		60,057		N/A
Labour win (new seat)				
Labour win (new seat)				

Islington South and Finsbury (2 seats)
Party	Candidate	Votes	%	±%
Labour	Frances Maine Galleway	11,818		N/A
Labour	Muriel J Hooker	11,551		N/A
SDP	John A Hennessy	10,453		N/A
SDP	William C Smith	10,295		N/A
Conservative	Robin WPH Hay	3,973		N/A
Conservative	Andrew J McHallam	3,865		N/A
Rejected ballots		649		
Turnout		51,955	87.9	N/A
Registered electors		59,087		N/A
Labour hold				
Labour hold				

=== Kensington and Chelsea ===
Chelsea (2 seats)
Party	Candidate	Votes	%	±%
Labour	Lesley Hammond	12,627		N/A
Labour	Lorna M Boreland	12,401		N/A
Conservative	Michael R Holt	8,704		N/A
Conservative	Graham H Pycock	3,038		N/A
SDP	Rosemary G Halsey	3,811		N/A
Alliance	Alexander JS Pringle	3,686		N/A
Rejected ballots		328		N/A
Turnout		32,985	67.2	N/A
Registered electors		49,049		N/A
Labour win (new seat)				
Labour win (new seat)				

Kensington (2 seats)
Party	Candidate	Votes	%	±%
Conservative	Bryan P Levitt	7,884		N/A
Conservative	Eric Ollerenshaw	7,390		N/A
Labour	Daniel Hilton	6,768		N/A
Labour	Stephen P Hoier	6,517		N/A
SDP	Shirley E Astley	3,414		N/A
Alliance	Robin TJ Tuck	3,209		N/A
Green	David F Davies	953		N/A
Independent	Len AA Green	419		N/A
Humanist	Clare Wayland	322		N/A
Rejected ballots		640		N/A
Turnout		36,876	77.1	N/A
Registered electors		47,803		N/A
Conservative win (new seat)				
Conservative win (new seat)				

=== Lambeth ===
Norwood (2 seats)
Party	Candidate	Votes	%	±%
Labour	Lesley Hammond	12,627		N/A
Labour	Lorna M Boreland	12,401		N/A
Conservative	Michael R Holt	8,704		N/A
Conservative	Graham H Peacock	8,565		N/A
SDP	Rosemary G Halsey	3,811		N/A
Alliance	Christopher J Berry	3,686		N/A
Rejected ballots		339		
Turnout		49,794	88.5	N/A
Registered electors		56,253		
Labour win (new seat)				
Labour win (new seat)				

Streatham (2 seats)
Party	Candidate	Votes	%	±%
Conservative	Muriel Gumbel	11,148		N/A
Conservative	Margaret Riddell	10,958		N/A
Labour	Andrew F Haynes	9,867		N/A
Labour	Colin R Talbot	8,896		N/A
Alliance	Alan J Leaman	3,811		N/A
SDP	Michael A Nightingale	5,294		N/A
Green	Roger CL Baker	1,044		N/A
Rejected ballots		543		
Turnout		52,583	87.8	N/A
Registered electors		59,887		N/A
Conservative win (new seat)				
Conservative win (new seat)				

Vauxhall (2 seats)
Party	Candidate	Votes	%	±%
Labour	John E O'Malley	14,386		N/A
Labour	Irma I Critchlow	13,966		N/A
Alliance	Michael W Tuffrey	5,938		N/A
Conservative	John H Spencer	5,757		N/A
SDP	Margaret D Wall	5,569		N/A
Conservative	Edward S.C. Bickham	5,550		N/A
National Front	John G Wright	425		N/A
Rejected ballots		519		
Turnout		51,591	78.9	N/A
Registered electors		65,351		N/A
Labour win (new seat)				
Labour win (new seat)				

=== Lewisham ===
Lewisham, Deptford (2 seats)
Party	Candidate	Votes	%	±%
Labour	Martin J Garman	13,156		N/A
Labour	Charles A Rossi	11,941		N/A
Conservative	Marian Rush	4,947		N/A
Conservative	Stephen M Ward	4,683		N/A
SDP	Philip G Easton	3,390		N/A
SDP	Edwin H Cox	3,196		N/A
Communist	Andrew Heywood	803		N/A
Rejected ballots		784		N/A
Turnout		42,116	73.2	N/A
Registered electors		57,503		N/A
Labour win (new seat)				
Labour win (new seat)				

Lewisham East (2 seats)
Party	Candidate	Votes	%	±%
Labour	Anstey A Rice	11,964		N/A
Labour	Hilary J Barnard	11,917		N/A
Conservative	Mary Draper	10,824		N/A
Conservative	Patrick NG Gilbert	10,243		N/A
SDP	Margaret I Drummond	5,012		N/A
Alliance	Stephen C Talbot	4,650		N/A
Rejected ballots		915		N/A
Turnout		54,610	90.9	N/A
Registered electors		60,054		N/A
Labour win (new seat)				
Labour win (new seat)				

Lewisham West (2 seats)
Party	Candidate	Votes	%	±%
Labour	John A Carr	10,699		N/A
Conservative	Daphne M Johnson	10,427		N/A
Labour	Mary Draper	10,073		N/A
Conservative	Alan JM Reese	9,768		N/A
SDP	John R Hilton	4,313		N/A
Alliance	Sarah C Titley	4,012		N/A
Independent Labour	Michael Price	1,714		N/A
Rejected ballots		1,159		N/A
Turnout		51,006	81.4	N/A
Registered electors		62,684		N/A
Labour win (new seat)				
Conservative win (new seat)				

=== Southwark ===
Dulwich (2 seats)
Party	Candidate	Votes	%	±%
Labour	Ann P Bernadt	11,735		N/A
Labour	Lloyd I Trott	10,506		N/A
Conservative	Diana M Ladas	8,357		N/A
Conservative	Dernitri C Argyropulo	7,678		N/A
SDP	Alison Farrow	4,416		N/A
SDP	Olga Kenyon	47,658		N/A
Green	Alex Goldie	982		N/A
Rejected ballots		574		N/A
Turnout		47,658	84.3	N/A
Registered electors		56,555		N/A
Labour win (new seat)				
Labour win (new seat)				

Peckham (2 seats)
Party	Candidate	Votes	%	±%
Labour	John Mann	12,716		N/A
Labour	Jameson A Mthethwa	11,203		N/A
Alliance	David CH Cartwright	3,688		N/A
Alliance	Stuart A Monk	3,560		N/A
Conservative	Christopher J Davies	2,666		N/A
Conservative	Roger K Evans	2,629		N/A
Rejected ballots		505		N/A
Turnout		36,462	61.2	N/A
Registered electors		59,548		N/A
Labour win (new seat)				
Labour win (new seat)				

Southwark and Bermondsey (2 seats)
Party	Candidate	Votes	%	±%
SDP	Dominic B Brennan	9,716		N/A
Alliance	Clive WB Brown	9,706		N/A
Labour	John RM Fowler	9,659		N/A
Labour	Anthony G Ritchie	8,956		N/A
Conservative	Andrew T Clayton	1,542		N/A
Conservative	Wilfred D lng	1,227		N/A
Rejected ballots		1,135		N/A
Turnout		40,805	73.7	N/A
Registered electors		55,390		N/A
SDP win (new seat)				
Alliance win (new seat)				

=== Tower Hamlets ===
Bethnal Green and Stepney (2 seats)
Party	Candidate	Votes	%	±%
Labour	Gwendoline Bernard	8,918		N/A
Labour	Peter Aylmer	8,748		N/A
Alliance	Barrie C Duffey	8,453		N/A
Alliance	Syed A Islam	7,734		N/A
Conservative	Bernard CJ Smith	2,236		N/A
Conservative	Paul W.E. Ingham	2,168		N/A
Independent	Abdul Hamid	1,267		N/A
Turnout		845		N/A
Turnout		39,524	67.8	N/A
Registered electors		58,263		N/A
Labour win (new seat)				
Labour win (new seat)				

Bow and Poplar (2 seats)
Party	Candidate	Votes	%	±%
Labour	Dennis Twomey	10,017		N/A
Labour	Belle Harris	9,927		N/A
Alliance	Janet I Ludlow	8,453		N/A
Alliance	Brian Williams	8,312		N/A
Conservative	Ralph M Harrison	2,340		N/A
Conservative	Barbara J Perrott	1,882		N/A
Independent	Abdul Hamid	1,267		N/A
Turnout		684		N/A
Turnout		40,931	69.5	N/A
Registered electors		58,855		N/A
Labour win (new seat)				
Labour win (new seat)				

=== Wandsworth ===
Battersea (2 seats)
Party	Candidate	Votes	%	±%
Labour	Margaret H Jones	15,707		N/A
Labour	John VN Lucas	14,864		N/A
Conservative	Cynthia S Kenny	12,043		N/A
Conservative	Peter J Luff	11,545		N/A
SDP	Michael F Harris	2,340		N/A
Alliance	James G Caple	2,893		N/A
Green	Sonia G Willington	1,032		N/A
Rejected ballots		678		N/A
Turnout		61,321	92.2	N/A
Registered electors		66,543		N/A
Labour win (new seat)				
Labour win (new seat)				

Putney (2 seats)
Party	Candidate	Votes	%	±%
Conservative	Margaret E Calcott-James	15,434		N/A
Conservative	Kathleen B Garnett	14,893		N/A
Labour	Vanessa B Cooper	14,008		N/A
Labour	Ashley Brarnall	13,292		N/A
Alliance	John Horrocks	4,044		N/A
SDP	John D.F Martyn	3,515		N/A
Green	Amanda J Hawes	988		N/A
Rejected ballots		679		N/A
Turnout		63,211	95.5	N/A
Registered electors		66,174		N/A
Conservative win (new seat)				
Conservative win (new seat)				

Tooting (2 seats)
Party	Candidate	Votes	%	±%
Labour	Lincoln Crawford	15,028		N/A
Labour	Paul CR Flather	15,023		N/A
Conservative	Peter D Donoghue	12,438		N/A
Conservative	Edward H Garnier	12,180		N/A
Alliance	Pamela J Sylvester	4,044		N/A
SDP	Martin Stott	4,172		N/A
Green	Monica E Vickery	1,472		N/A
Rejected ballots		673		N/A
Turnout		64,499	94.2	N/A
Registered electors		68,495		N/A
Labour win (new seat)				
Labour win (new seat)				

=== Cities of London and Westminster ===
Westminster North (2 seats)
Party	Candidate	Votes	%	±%
Labour	Steven J. Cowan	11,538		N/A
Labour	Barbara J Grahame	11,507		N/A
Conservative	Ian D Harvey	9,624		N/A
Conservative	Frances Taylor	9,447		N/A
SDP	Mary Gifford	4,050		N/A
Alliance	Robert E. Bell	3,854		N/A
Reform London Schools	George A Colerick	406		N/A
Reform London Schools	Sonia G Willington	304		N/A
Rejected ballots		871		N/A
Turnout		50,730	77.2	N/A
Registered electors		65,744		N/A
Labour win (new seat)				
Labour win (new seat)				

City of London and Westminster South (2 seats)
Party	Candidate	Votes	%	±%
Conservative	David J Avery	11,162		N/A
Conservative	Katherine R Tracey	10,445		N/A
Labour	Margaret E Cahill	5,855		N/A
Labour	Mair E Garside	5,816		N/A
SDP	Elizabeth J Atkinson	3,979		N/A
Alliance	Hugh P Mooney	3,556		N/A
Rejected ballots		392		N/A
Turnout		40,813	65.5	N/A
Registered electors		62,274		N/A
Conservative win (new seat)				
Conservative win (new seat)				

== Subsequent by-elections ==
7 May 1987 Streatham by-election (1 seat)
Party	Candidate	Votes	%	±%
Conservative	MD Leigh	9,865	45.7	+4.5
Labour	John McDonnell	6,877	31.9	−3.1
Alliance	MW Tuffrey	4,333	20.1	+0.1
Green	RCL Baker	411	1.9	−2.0
Independent	GA Colerick	86	0.4	N/A
Rejected ballots		2,988		
Turnout		21,572	35.7	N/A
Registered electors		60,495		+1.02
Conservative hold		Swing	{{{swing}}}	

1 December 1988 Southwark and Bermondsey by-election (1 seat)
Party	Candidate	Votes	%	±%
Alliance	RE Colley	5,961	63.9	+16.3
Labour	JRM Fowler	2,739	29.3	−16.3
Conservative	P Gray	552	5.9	−0.9
Communist	PN Power	80	0.9	N/A
Rejected ballots		3,222		
Turnout		9,332	16.6	N/A
Registered electors		56,217		+1.49
Alliance hold		Swing	{{{swing}}}	
