= Queen Anne Grammar School =

Former school in York, England

Coordinates: 53.964549°N 1.093492°W

Queen Anne Grammar School for Girls was a single-sex state grammar school in the city of York, England. It began in 1906 as the Municipal Secondary School for Girls and was based in Brook Street. At the end of 1909 the pupils were transferred to a new 5 1/2-acre site in Clifton. The school was officially opened on 18 January 1910 by the Archbishop of York, Cosmo Gordon Lang.

The school's name was changed in 1920 and Queen Anne was chosen as it was situated on Queen Anne's Road. The school emblem was a sphinx underneath which was a furled ribbon reading the school motto Quod Potui Perfeci.

The school became a co-educational comprehensive in 1985 and was renamed Queen Anne School. It closed in June 2000 and in 2001 St Olave's School moved to the site.

== Headmistresses ==
- 1910–1938 Emily Netherwood
- 1938–1942 Doris J. Milner
- 1942–1960 Joyce Aspden
- 1960–1985 Irene Whittaker

== Notable former pupils ==
- Kate Atkinson, author
- Barbara Hulme, botanist.
- Janet McTeer, actress
- Frances Morrell, Labour politician, Leader from 1983 to 1987 of the Inner London Education Authority (ILEA)
- Lynn Picknett, writer, researcher and lecturer
- Alan Mak, Conservative MP for Havant since 2015
