= Hypericum qinlingense =

Scientific classification
- Kingdom: Plantae
- Clade: Tracheophytes
- Clade: Angiosperms
- Clade: Eudicots
- Clade: Rosids
- Order: Malpighiales
- Family: Hypericaceae
- Genus: Hypericum
- Subgenus: Hypericum subg. Hypericum
- Section: Hypericum sect. Elodeoida
- Species: H. qinlingense

Binomial name
- Hypericum qinlingense X.C.Du & Y.Ren

Species of flowering plant in St John's wort family

Hypericum qinlingense is a species of flowering plant in the St. John's wort family Hypericaceae. It is a perennial herb native to the Shaanxi province of China that grows up to 40 centimeters tall. The species has a rosette at its base, stiff and papery leaves, a flower cluster consisting of two parallel branches, and yellow-brown stripes of glands on its sepals and petals. It is similar in appearance to H. elodeoides, H. petiolatum, and species of section Adenosepalum that are native to China. H. qinlingense can be found on exposed slopes, roadsides, and in forests of oak, birch, and fir trees.

== Description ==
Hypericum qinlingense is a perennial herb that grows 30–40 centimeters tall. It has one or several stems that arise from a rosette at the base of the plant. The stems have a circular cross-section and are mostly smooth, with glandular spots and stripes. The length between leaf nodes is 1–4.5 cm, and the leaf stalks are 0.1 cm long. The leaves are stiff and have a papery texture. Leaves on the main stems are 1.3–2.9 cm long and 0.5–1.0 wide, while those on the branches are smaller, 0.6–1.0 cm long and 0.2–0.3 cm wide. They have light colored glands on their surface and black glands around the edges.

The flower cluster (inflorescence) of the species is a cyme consisting of two parallel branches (dichasium). The bracts are lance-shaped and 0.3–0.5 cm long. The flowers are yellow and roughly 0.8 cm wide, with a persistent perianth. The five sepals are lance-shaped and 0.3–0.4 cm long, and have yellow-brown stripes of glands from the base to the tip and black glands along their edges. There are five petals which are linear in shape and 0.4–0.6 cm long, with similar stripes of glands to the sepals, but black glands only at the tip. There are three bundles of stamens in groups of 10–12, each of which are around 0.4 cm long. The ovary is an ovoid shape, around 0.4 cm long by 0.3 cm wide, and has three styles roughly one-third of its length. The seed capsules are an oval shape and split open when dry, with yellow-brown glands and around 180 seeds inside. The seeds are 0.06 cm long and are pitted like a honeycomb.

Hypericum qinlingense is similar to H. elodeoides, especially in that the flower clusters of the two species are the same shape. It can be told apart by the black glands at the base of its bracts, having fewer stamens per bundle, and the smaller size of many of its flower parts.

== Taxonomy ==
The species was first collected in 2001 by botanists Xi Chun Du and Yi Ren, who designated a holotype and five paratypes. Hypericum qinlingense was formally described by Du and Ren in 2005. They made comparisons between H. qinlingense and Hypericum elodeoides, as well as other Chinese species of section Adenosepalum. The taxon was not considered its own species in the 2007 edition of Flora of China, but was instead listed as a synonym of Hypericum petiolatum subsp. yunnanense. In the final volume of a monograph of the genus Hypericum by botanist Norman Robson, H. qinlingense was proposed to be an "extreme form" of H. petiolatum subsp. yunnanese, instead of a synonym of that taxon. Robson cited the much shorter length of the styles of H. qinlingense and the different arrangement and color of its glands as reasons for the differentiation. In the 2013 online version of Robson's monograph, H. qinlingense was placed into section Elodeoida. Under that arrangement, the placement of the species within the genus would appear as such:

Hypericum

Hypericum sect. Elodeoida

H. austroyunnanicum – H. elodeoides – H. hubeiense – H. kingdonii – H. petiolulatum – H. qinlingense – H. seniawinii

== Distribution, habitat, and ecology ==
Hypericum qinlingense has only been recorded from the Yang County of Shaanxi Province in China, on the southern slope of Mount Qinling. It is found in areas with a temperate biome. The habitat of the species is on exposed slopes, roadsides, and forested areas at elevations of 1320–2450 meters. The forests where the species is found consist of either deciduous oak trees or coniferous birch and fir trees.
