= Lincoln Crawford =

British barrister

Lincoln Santo Crawford, OBE (1 November 1944 – 12 July 2020) was a Trinidad-born British barrister.

== Biography ==
Lincoln Crawford arrived in the United Kingdom in 1967, aged 18, arriving on a cargo boat.

Crawford attended Brunel University. Crawford was called to the bar in 1977.

Crawford worked at King's Bench Walk.

Crawford was the most junior member of counsel to the inquiry into the 1981 Brixton riot led by Lord Scarman. Crawford was on the Commission for Racial Equality from 1984 to 1990 - he acted as its chairman in 1985. Between 1986 and 1990, Crawford was a member of the elected Inner London Education Authority for Tooting.

Crawford was the chair of a 1996 review into the treatment of mentally ill patient Martin Mursell, a 2000 investigation into the employment policies of the British Council and a 2001 investigation into the schools admissions policies in Barnet. Crawford chaired a 2004 Home Office working party on slavery.

In 2007, Crawford addressed a United Nations event to commemorate the bicentenary of the end of the skave trade.

Crawford worked as a recorder in employment law.

Crawford's first marriage was to Janet Clegg, a civil servant.

Crawford's second marriage was to Bronwen Jenkins, daughter of Clive Jenkins. In 2006 Crawford was convicted of harassing Bronwen Jenkins, and was then made subject to a restraining order. In 2012, Crawford was found to have breached the restraining order. This meant that he became unable to judge cases, but he was able to continue practicing as a barrister. In 2015, he was convicted of six counts of breaching the restraining order. He was sentenced to nine months, suspended for 24 months.
