= Rank and File Mobilising Committee =

- Founded: 1980
- Dissolved: 1981
- Headquarters: London, United Kingdom
- Ideology: Democratic socialism
- Newspaper: Mobilise for Labour Democracy

The Rank and File Mobilising Committee (RFMC) was an umbrella group which coordinated left wing groups to campaign for increased democracy within the Labour Party.

The RFMC operated from 1980 to 1981, during which time it defended the mandatory reselection of MPs (won at the 1979 Party Conference), secured an electoral college for the election of Labour Leaders and provided the organising base for Tony Benn's 1981 Deputy Leadership campaign, which narrowly lost with 49.6% of the vote.

== Founding ==
Following the successful campaign to change Labour Party rules to make it easier to deselect sitting Labour MPs at Labour Party Conference 1979, the Socialist Campaign for a Labour Victory suggested to the Campaign for Labour Party Democracy that a group be established to defend these reforms and campaign for greater democracy within the Labour Party. The RMFC was founded in May 1980 as a result of these discussions.

Tony Benn records the founding of the RMFC in his diary of 30 May 1980:

"Frances Morell rang to tell me about the Rank and File Mobilising Committee, which is working to get together the CLPD, LCC, Institute for Workers' Control, Independent Labour Publications and the Socialist Campaign for a Labour Victory, to agree on a programme of party democracy. In the evening we had a party, a sort of new left gathering, with Frances, Ken Livingstone of the GLC, Victor Schonfield, Audrey Wise, Tom Litterick, Chris Mullin, James Curran, a lecturer at PCL, his wife Margaret, George Osgerby, one of James's Students, Dick Clements and Biddy, Geoff Bish [then head of the Labour Party research department], Dawn Primarolo, Jon Lansman of CLPD, Peter Hain and others. These are the people who have formed the Rank and File Mobilising Committee and, when the time comes, they will be the people who organise the Benn election campaign."

=== Founding members ===
- Socialist Campaign for a Labour Victory
- Campaign for Labour Party Democracy
- Labour Co-ordinating Committee
- Independent Labour Publications
- the Institute for Workers' Control
- National Organisation of Labour Students
- Clause Four Group

=== Later members ===
- Militant
- Labour Party Young Socialists
- Labour Action for Peace
- Socialist Educational Association

== Campaigning aims ==
The groups brought together as RFMC had extensive disagreements on general political aims and tactics, however they were united in their desire for greater democracy within the Labour Party and all recognised that collaboration would increase their chances of success.

The RFMC agreed five constitutional campaigning objectives which aimed to increase party democracy. The below table reflects the slightly different formulations of these campaigning objectives.

The five agreed campaigning objectives of the RFMC
Frances Morrell in 'Mobilise for Labour democracy'	David Kogan in 'The Battle for the Labour Party'	Patrick Seyd in 'The Labour Left'
Mandatory reselection	Reaffirm mandatory reselection	Defence of mandatory reselection
Defence of the present structure of the NEC	Defence of the present structure of the NEC	Defence of the present structure of the NEC
NEC to have the final say on the manifesto	Implement the conference decision [that the NEC had ultimate control] on the drafting of the manifesto	Ultimate control of the manifesto by the NEC
Election of the leader by the whole party	Election of leader by electoral college	Election of the leader and deputy leader by the party as a whole
An accountable Parliamentary Party with each member pledged to implement party policy.	Assertion of the duty of the PLP to implement party policy, to be accountable to the party and internally democratic in all its operations 'with all its deliberations and voting made public'.	Accountability of an open and democratic decision-making within the PLP

== Campaigning activities ==
The struggle for an accountable Parliamentary Labour Party could fundamentally alter the nature of British Politics.

It is a struggle for a Party whose election promises are offered in good faith and whose bid for the vote of the working people is accompanied by an uncompromising loyalty to their interests.

Only if we all campaign unremittingly together can we hope to succeed.

— Frances Morrell, writing in Socialist Organiser in June 1980,

In the months leading up to the 1980 Labour Party Conference the RFMC organised 20 large rallies across the country in support of the Left's agreed campaigning aims.

RFMC printed 10,000 copies of the campaigning broadsheet "Mobilise for Labour Democracy" which included a statement of aims from Tony Benn, articles setting out the case for democratic reforms of the party and descriptions for how activists could get involved in selling the broadsheet, organising meetings and passing resolutions in their Labour Party and Trade Union branches.

Jon Lansman, then secretary of the RFMC, set out the campaigning activities of the group in the early months of the campaign:

"All the organisations have buried the sectarian hatchets which have divided the campaign for party democracy in the past. Numerous CLPs have expressed their support already and many more will follow; but it has been much more than paper commitments. Throughout the country, party and trade union activists are meeting on their own initiatives to organise rallies, to distribute our broadsheet "Mobilise for Labour Democracy" and to ensure that motions are sent to conference on the democratic issues."

=== Commission of Inquiry ===
Following that year's Labour Party Conference, where rule changes were passed making it easier to deselect MPs, the NEC set up a Commission of Inquiry in September 1979 in response to demands from Trade Union leaders for a review of party operations and democracy. The Labour Right hoped that this NEC Commission could be the vehicle for halting or reversing the reforms to party democracy.

=== Election of Labour Party leaders ===
In the 9 Labour Party Leadership elections from 1922 to 1976 only the MPs of the Parliamentary Labour Party could vote. CLPD had organised motions to Labour Party Conference in 1979 calling for an extension of the franchise to include affiliated trade unions, Constituency Labour Party members and socialist societies, but had been defeated.

The NEC Commission suggested (contrary to the wishes of then Labour Leader James Callaghan) that party leaders should be elected by an electoral college consisting of 50% MPs, 25% Trade Unions, 20% Constituency Parties and 5% socialist societies.

The RFMC opposed this proposal and organised against it, circulating a CLPD motion which criticised the NEC Commission proposals on grounds that they "would make the Parliamentary Party dominant and under-represent trade unions and constituency parties".

At Labour Conference in 1980 a motion was passed which supported the principle of widening the franchise for electing the party, but none of the motions specifying a particular balance between the component parts of the franchise was successful. An emergency resolution was then passed calling for a special conference in January 1981 to decide the issue.

At the Wembley Special Party Conference in 1981 RFMC successfully, and narrowly, organised to secure a victory for an electoral college comprised 30% Parliamentary Labour Party, 30% Constituency Labour Party and 40% affiliated organisations. This has been described as the second "major victory" for the Labour Left in increasing party democracy, along with the successful campaign for mandatory reselection at the 1979 Labour Party Conference.

However, James Callaghan resigned before the new rules were in place in order to ensure that his successor would only be decided by the MPs of the Parliamentary Labour Party in the hope that his intended successor Denis Healey would win. Healey lost to Michael Foot.

== Tony Benn's Deputy Leadership Campaign and dissolution ==
The RFMC has been described by Labour historians as providing the "main base for the campaign to elect Tony Benn as the Party's Deputy Leader". Benn's campaign narrowly lost with 49.6% of the vote.

The decision to dissolve the RFMC was taken in October 1981, shortly after that year's Labour Party Conference and the Deputy Leadership election which took place at that year's Conference.

== Legacy ==
Labour Historian Patrick Seyd described RFMC's legacy:

"The RFMC was a unique organisation in the history of the Labour Left. For a period the Labour Left was united around one issue (limiting the powers of Labour parliamentarians) and the multitude of organisations operated together as a single unit. "

== See also ==
- Momentum
