= Henry Price (architect) =

British architect (1867–1944)

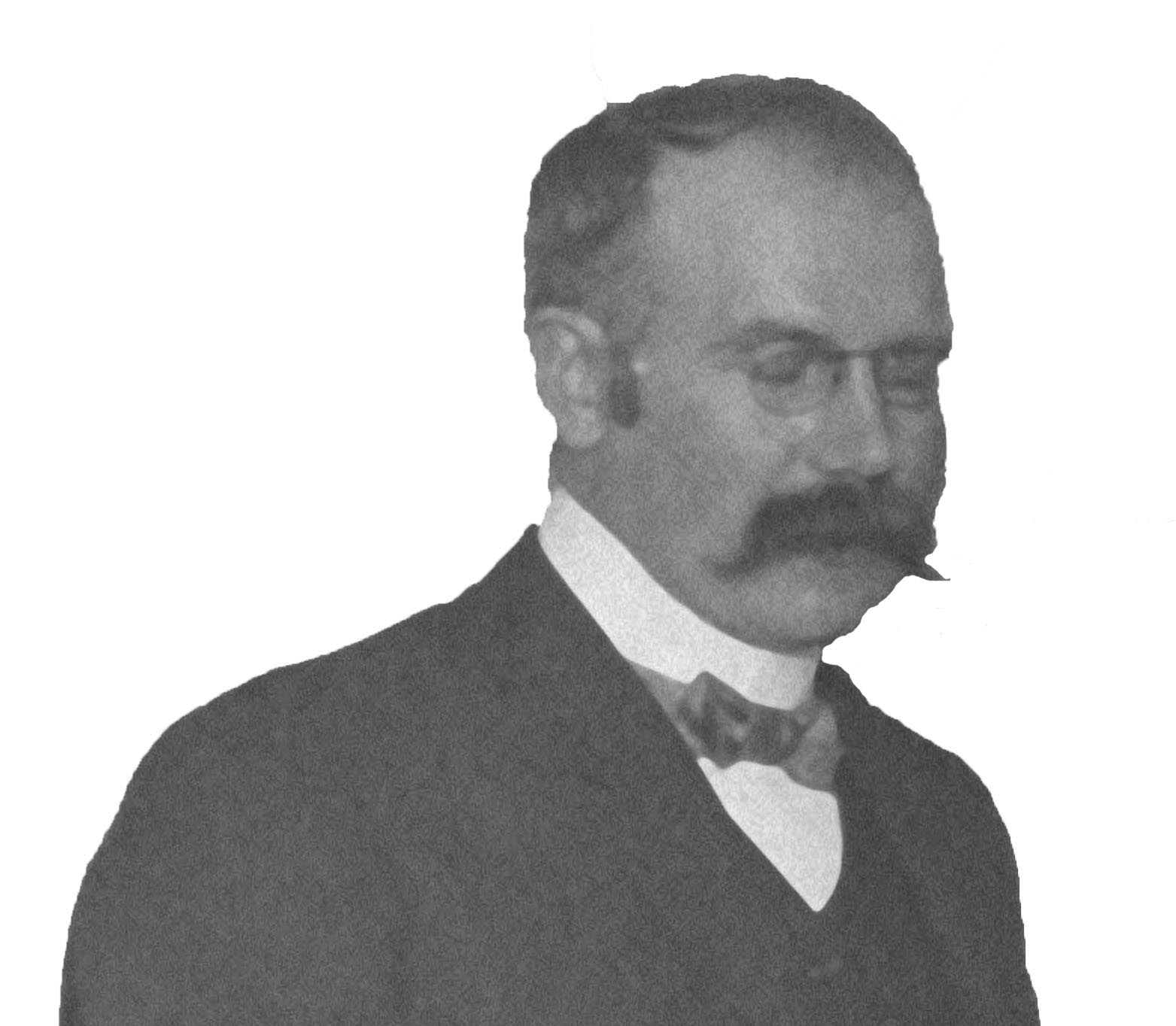
- (John) Henry Price, c. 1905
- Born: 1867; England
- Died: 10 April 1944 (aged 76–77)
- Occupation: Architect
- Practice: Manchester City Architect's Department
- Buildings: Victoria Baths (Harpurhey baths 1910), Manchester; Didsbury Library, Manchester
- Projects: Hydraulic Power Station, Manchester

John Henry Price (1867 – 10 April 1944) was a British architect. He was the first person to hold the office of 'City Architect' in Manchester Corporation's newly created City Architect's Department of 1902. He was responsible for a number of well-known Manchester landmarks, and is credited with influencing the design of other buildings constructed during his tenure, such as Manchester Fire Station.

== Career ==
John Henry Price was articled with Thomas Denville Barry and Charles Garret Barry (1884–1888) and started his career as an architect's assistant ("Improver") in Liverpool with Edmund Kirby from 1888 to 1892. From 1892 he was the Assistant Surveyor to Toxteth Park Board, and in 1897 he became the building surveyor for Birmingham. On leaving Birmingham, to go to Manchester, as a tribute he was presented with a gold watch and engraved instrument set in recognition of his contribution to the city. On March 11, 1895, Price was admitted as an Associate of the Royal Institute of British Architects (ARIBA), having been proposed by Kirby, H. Hartley, and T. Cook.

In June 1902, he was appointed as the first City Architect for Manchester. The Corporation of Manchester had set up the City Architect's Department in response to an incident that was thought to be the result of improper coordination and demarcation of the roles of various staff positions of the City Surveyor's Department. Under Price, the roles of the offices of surveyor and architect were more clearly circumscribed. The City Architect's Department still answered to the City Council. He retired as Manchester City Architect in August of 1932, and was succeeded by George Noel Hill.

As a mentor, the Scottish architect Duncan Mckerrow trained under him from 1902 to about 1912.

== Personal life ==
Price married Sarah Dallow in 1896.

== Name ==
There is some confusion over his name. In family photographs and personal letters he frequently appears as "John Henry Price", as opposed to work attributions, where he is simply "Henry Price". In the index by Nikolaus Pevsner, the Ashton House reference uses "H. R. Price" and refers to him as the City Architect. His brother-in-law, Henry P. Dallow, refers to him as "Harry" when Price was courting Dallow's sister, and as "John Henry" in reference to the engagement.

There was only one Manchester City Architect called "Henry Price" in the period 1902 to 1934. Presumably there was an "H. Price" working earlier in the area, as an "H.R. Price" is listed by Pevsner as the architect for St Clements, Denmark Rd, Mosside Manchester, Mosside/Whalley Range (1881); and St Edmunds, Alexandra Rd South, Whalley Range (1881–2); and a "Price, H. R." is listed as the architect for St Pauls, Springfield Rd Sale Cheshire (1883-4). Either those reference an unrelated "H.R. Price" or represent errors in date or attribution by Pevsner.

== Notable buildings ==
=== Victoria Baths ===
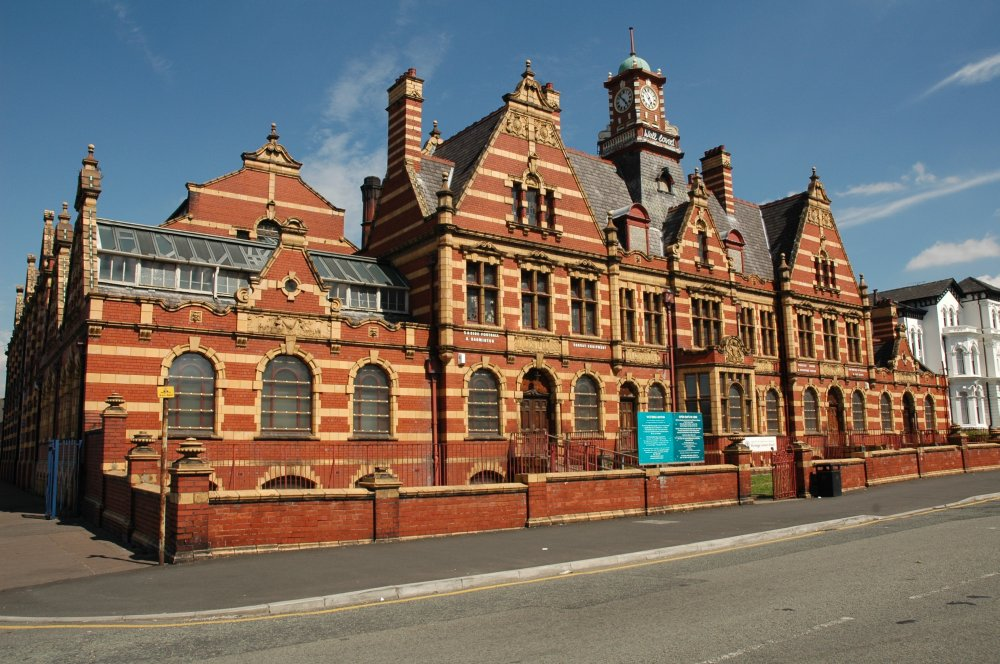
Victoria Baths, Chorlton-on-Medlock, Manchester

Manchester's Victoria Baths were built between 1903 and 1906 by Henry Price, then the City Architect, based on 1901–02 designs by the City Surveyor T. de Courcy Meade and his assistant Arthur Davies. Price was responsible for the detailed plans, and may also have designed some of the terracotta work. Opened by Manchester Corporation in 1906, the baths closed in 1993. Originally a prestigious complex containing private baths, a laundry, Turkish Baths, and, from 1952, the first public Aeratone™ bath (an early type of Jacuzzi™ whirlpool) in the UK, the Victoria Baths are listed at Grade II* and retain many of their original features. In September 2003, the building won BBC Two's Restoration competition, although progress on renovation has been slow.

=== Withington Baths ===
Withington Baths, on Burton Road in Manchester was built by Price in 1913. It is notable for making no distinction between first and second-class bathing and, in 1914, for becoming the first baths in the city to permit mixed bathing. The building was refurbished in 2003 to include a fitness centre.

=== Levenshulme Baths ===
Opening in 1921, Levenshulme Swimming Baths was the pool where Sunny Lowry, the first British woman to swim the English Channel, trained in 1933 as she developed her aptitude for long-distance swimming. She and her sister used the baths to prepare for distance competitions in Windermere.

For nearly 100 years, the former public baths served the Levenshulme community, later adding a sauna, steam room and gym to its two swimming pools.

=== Harpurhey Baths ===
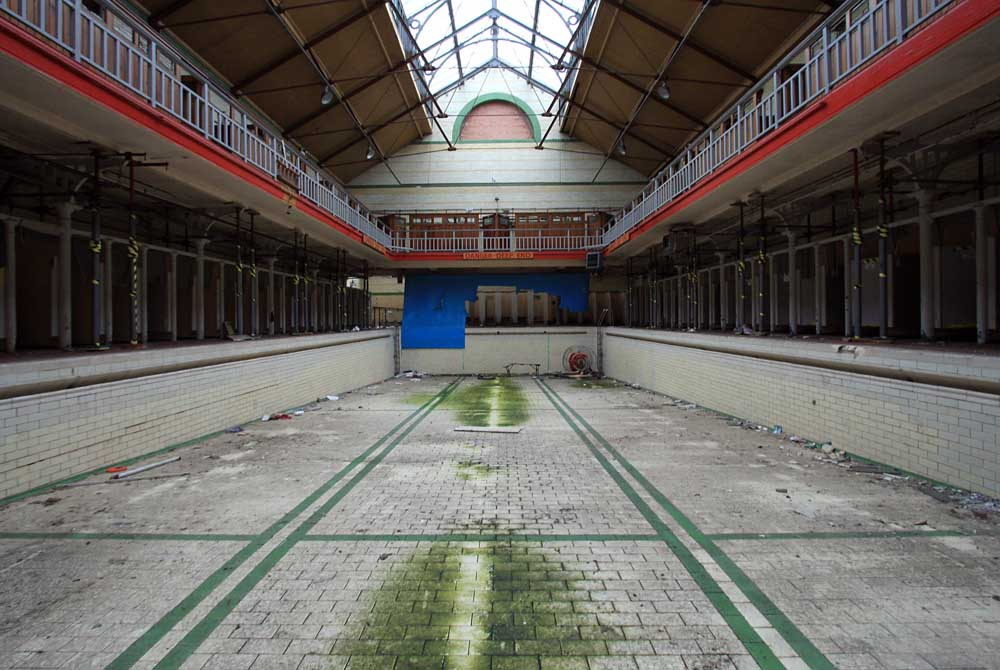
Harpurhey Baths August 2008

Harpurhey Baths, on Rochdale Road in Manchester, is a Grade II-listed building. Built in 1909–10 by Price, its exterior incorporates Baroque motifs. The interior is relatively ornate, though less so than Victoria Baths, and remains partially intact, but is in very poor condition. The baths closed completely in 2001 after serious defects were discovered in the building's walls and machinery. Cracks that had previously been repaired had widened beyond repair, some walls had begun to bow, and there were further problems with the steam boilers and drainage system.

Part of the site has since been redeveloped with the construction of North Manchester Sixth Form College and North City Library. This scheme includes a project to restore the front of the Grade II-listed building and convert the former first-class male pool into an exhibition space and meeting hall. John Walker of Walker Simpson Architects said: "It would be great to give the building a new lease of life and open it up so it can be used by the community again."

City council leader Sir Richard Leese described the baths as "a noteworthy part of Manchester's heritage" and welcomed their return to community use. Mancat, which merged with City College on 1 August 2008 to become The Manchester College, stated that the former second-class male pool would need to be sacrificed so that the remainder of the structure could be preserved. The scheme has the support of English Heritage. The college, part of the Manchester College of Arts and Technology, has expansion plans for the site.

=== Carnegie libraries ===
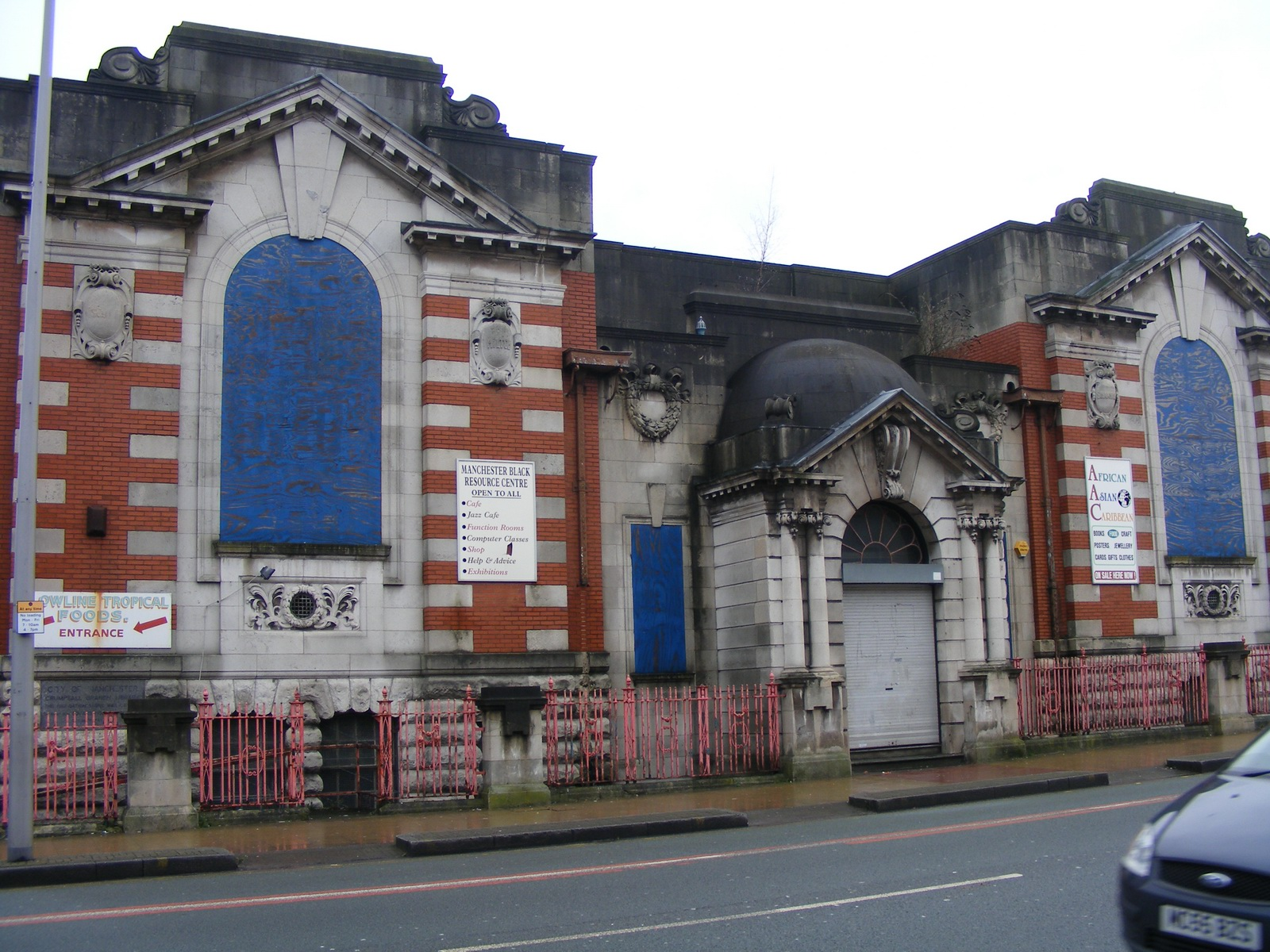
Crumpsall and Cheetham District Library, Manchester

Andrew Carnegie—the industrial magnate and millionaire who believed passionately in free libraries—promised £15,000 for libraries in Didsbury, Withington and Chorlton if suitable sites could be found. Four houses, including an old loom house, were cleared on Wilmslow Road to make way for the Didsbury building. The libraries are known as Carnegie libraries.

- Chorlton Library. Grade II listed. Red brick with Portland stone dressings. Single-storey and flat-roofed. Edwardian Baroque style. Chorlton Library was constructed in 1914 to the designs of Henry Price, City Architect, and was funded by a £5000 donation from the steel magnate and philanthropist, "Andrew Carnegie". In 1912 Henry Price's original plan drawings for the building, which were being sent to Andrew Carnegie for approval, went down with the RMS Titanic; duplicate copies were sent later.
- Didsbury Library. Described by Price as "designed in the fifteenth century gothic style with tracery windows and emblems of Science, Knowledge, Literature, Music and Arts and Crafts in stone distributed over the building". Small in scale but with cathedral-like aspirations, the library is a temple to reading at the centre of the village that many regard as Manchester's most desirable suburb. Internally the electric light was designed to allow the public free access to the shelves, browsing and reading areas. The walls were tiled to dado height, the floor cork carpeted and the oak furniture, fittings and partitions were provided by Armitage and Wolfe of John Dalton Street for £600. When the library opened on Saturday 15 May 1915 at 4.30 pm the great and the good gathered for the occasion. Fletcher Moss, deputy chairman of the libraries committee, opened the door with a gold key, in front of civic dignitaries and the public who were keen to see the permanent free library. The library is Grade II listed. During the English Civil War, Prince Rupert stationed himself in a building that earlier stood at the site, which is commemorated with a Blue Plaque on the library.
- Withington Library. Purpose-built and funded partly from money donated by the philanthropist Andrew Carnegie, Withington Library opened its doors on 30 May 1927. There is a series of photographs on the Manchester City site, from site demolition in 1925, views in the 1950s, and pre and post the 1970s interior modernisation.
- Crumpsall & Cheetham District Library. Grade II Listed. Bury Old Road, Manchester M8 9JN. 1909–1911. Red brick and white limestone with dressings of the same (roof concealed). Rectangular plan on corner site. Edwardian Baroque style. High single-storey over basement, three wide bays, symmetrical, consisting of projected wings embracing a central entrance lobby with projected porch; with basement of heavily rock-faced masonry, stone quoins to the wings, and high stepped stone parapet. The centre, of limestone ashlar, has a rectangular porch with channelled rustication, a round-headed doorway with voluted keystone and open-pedimented architrave with coupled columns, and semi-spherical roof; the wings have modillioned open pediments, broad quoined pilasters with cartouches lettered "SCOTT" and "MILTON" (left wing) "SHAKESPEARE" and "DICKENS" (right wing), and modillioned friezes and pediments, and in the centre of each wing a tall round-headed window with limestone surround including carved apron and elongated triple keystone. Five-bay left return wall in simpler style, with segmental-headed windows. Basement area protected by wrought-iron railings with limestone piers, geometrical open-work standards, bar railings with attached swags and festoons, and flaming-urn finials. Interior: segmental arcades (blocked); segmental-vaulted ceiling; The foundation stone is earlier. In July 1974 the library was moved to new accommodation in the Abraham Moss Centre. It served as the Manchester Black Resource Centre but finally closed after a fatal shooting on a New Year's Eve party in 1999. A Facebook Page in support of preservation is here. The building was sold for in excess of £500,000 at auction on 19 March 2015, and building work is currently ongoing.

=== Hydraulic Power Station, now People's History Museum ===
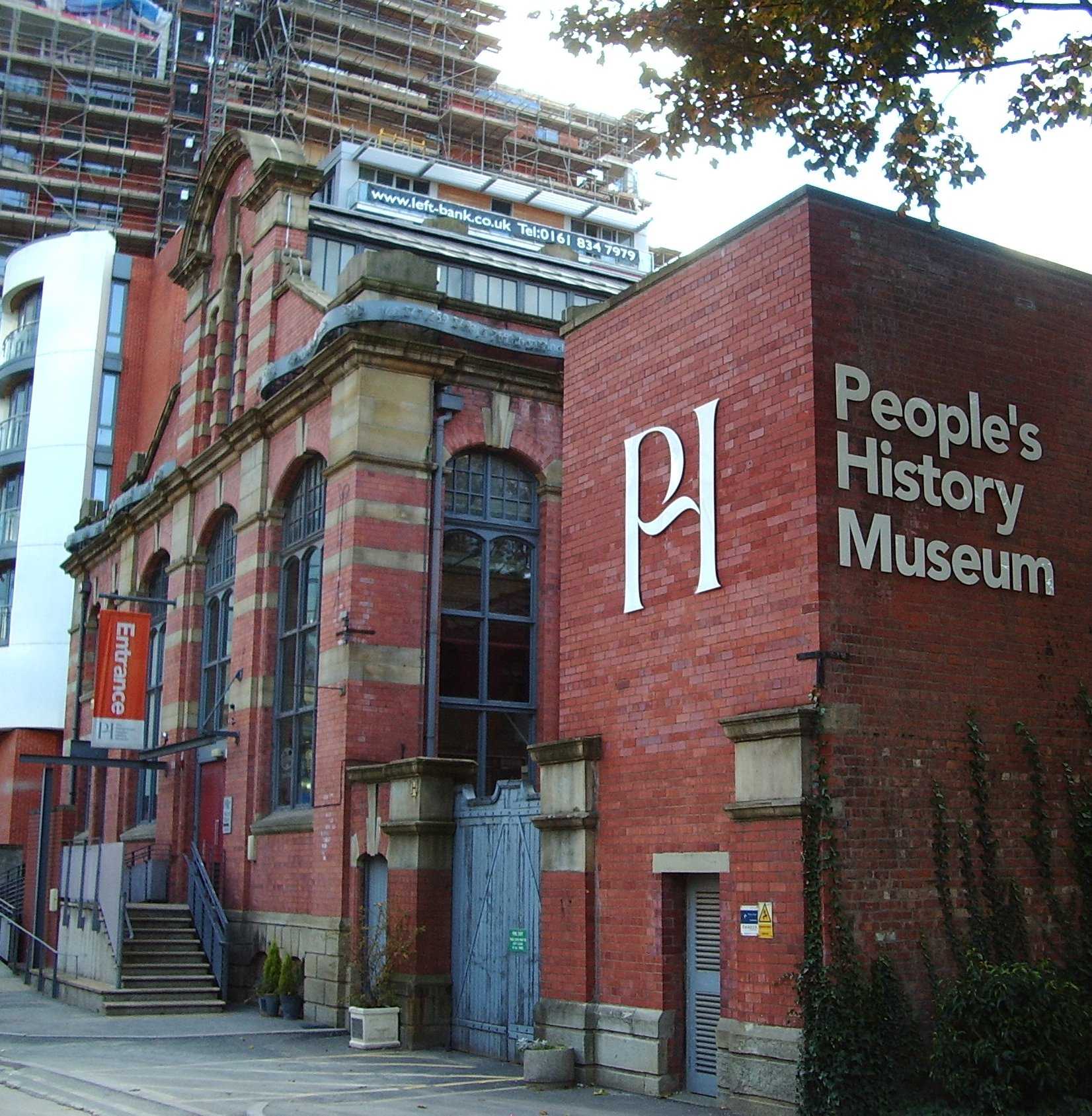
People's History Museum, Manchester

The former Hydraulic Power Station, constructed 1907–09. Now the People's History Museum.

The Pump House in Bridge Street on the banks of the River Irwell has only been the People's History Museum since May 1994. Before that it was a hydraulic pumping station and is now the only surviving Edwardian pumping station in the city. It opened in 1909 and was the third and last station of the hydraulic pumping network in Manchester. The other two stations were situated on Whitworth Street and Pott Street.

The station used to supply power to the mills and warehouses that dominated the city at the beginning of the 19th century. It wound the Town Hall clock and even raised the curtain at the Opera House. The mighty water-powered pumping station also doubled up as an aquarium and a swimming pool. Legend has it that staff at the Pump House kept fish and swam in the large water tanks on the roof of the building. In 1972 the station closed when hydraulic power was superseded by electricity.

All that remains of the internal machinery is a pumping engine, moved to become a star exhibit at Manchester's Museum of Science and Industry situated in the oldest passenger railway buildings in the world on Liverpool Road in Castlefield. The engine, 15 feet (4.6 m) high and weighing 25 tons (25 t), has been restored and is in full working order.

=== Ashton House ===
Women's lodging house, Dantzic Street, 1908–10.

Ashton House stands on Corporation Street in the area of Ancoats known as Angel Meadow. This was one of the worst slums of the Victorian city and many buildings here were designed to provide better housing for the poor. Ashton House, for example, was designed as model lodgings for women. It was built by the Corporation, 1908–10, by the City Architect H. Price. It catered for 222 women, who occupied dormitories with individual cubicles and cooked for themselves in communal kitchens. A lodging house for men existed nearby on Pollard Street. It stands on an island site, with a very narrow rounded end to the junction with Crown Lane. Free Style, red brick and cream terracotta. Nice details include ironwork with flower motifs, lettering in the gable to the corner with Aspin Lane and voussoirs of tiles laid on edge. It was university student accommodation, but Ashton House has recently been sold and refurbished and is currently used as a boutique Hostel and aparthotel.

=== Manchester Barton Aerodrome ===
Britain's first municipal airport... Manchester's Barton Aerodrome was the first municipal aerodrome, though its location was criticised and early airlines chose to operate from Liverpool instead. The control tower remains, and it is now used both as a Helicopter base for the air ambulance, and for commercial aviation.
