= People's History Museum =

Museum in Manchester, England

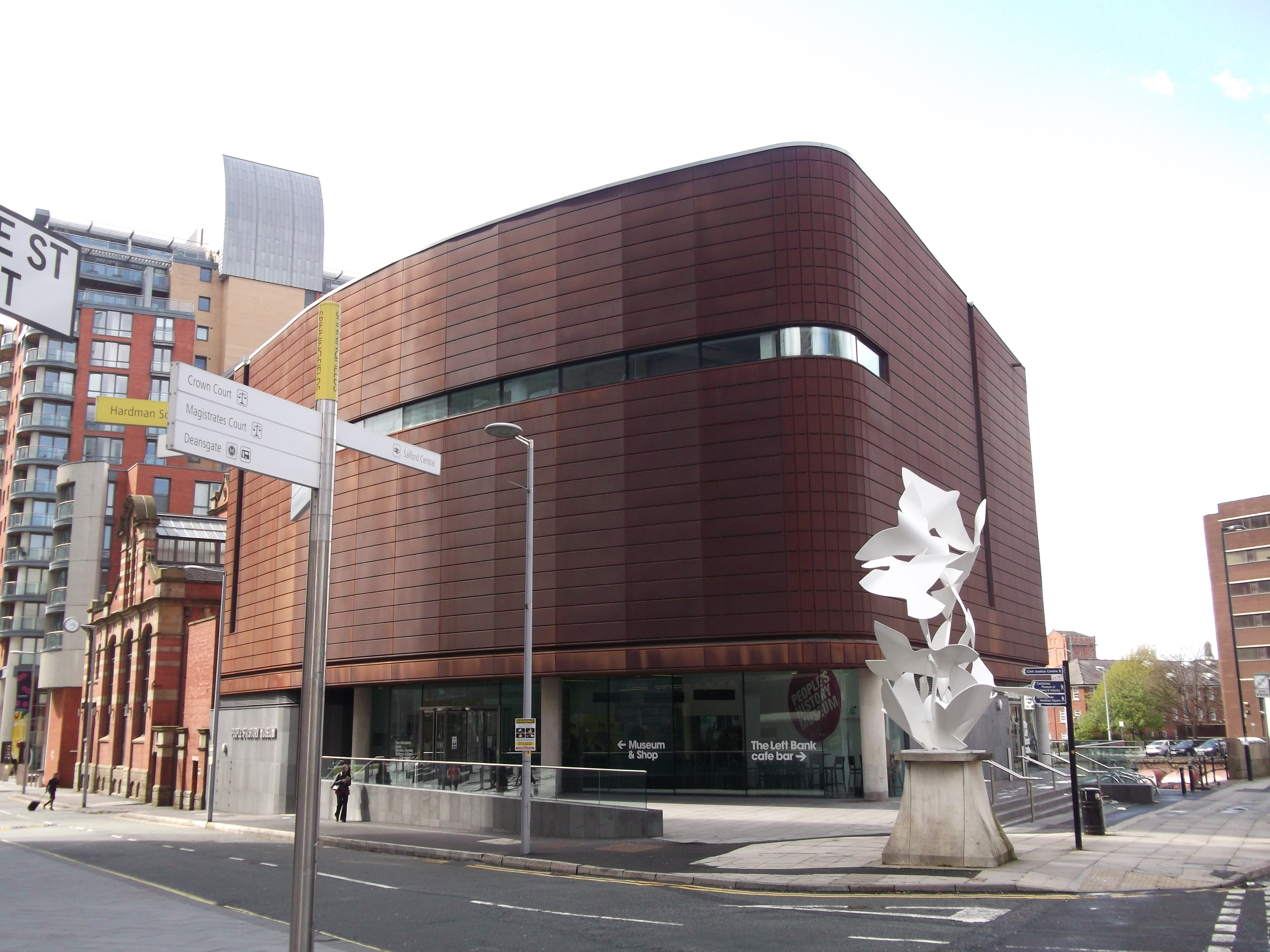
- The People's History Museum

- The location of the museum within Manchester
- Former name: National Museum of Labour History
- Location: Left Bank, Manchester, M3 3ER, United Kingdom
- Coordinates: 53.48134°N 2.2533°W
- Type: History museum
- Architect: Henry Price
- Website: phm.org.uk

Listed Building – Grade II
- Official name: Former Hydraulic Power Station in grounds of City College
- Designated: 22 July 1992
- Reference no.: 1254724

The People's History Museum (the National Museum of Labour History until 2001) in Manchester, England, is the United Kingdom's national centre for the collection, conservation, interpretation and study of material relating to the history of working people in the UK. It is located in a Grade II listed, former hydraulic pumping station on the corner of Bridge Street and Water Street designed by Manchester Corporation city architect, Henry Price.

The museum tells the history of workers' rights and democracy in Great Britain and about people's lives at home, work and leisure over the last 200 years. The collection contains printed material, physical objects and photographs of people at work, rest and play. Some of the topics covered include popular radicalism, the Peterloo Massacre, 19th century trade unionism, the women's suffrage movement, dockers, the cooperative movement, the 1945 general election, and football. It also includes material relating to friendly societies, the welfare movement and advances in the lives of working people.

== History ==
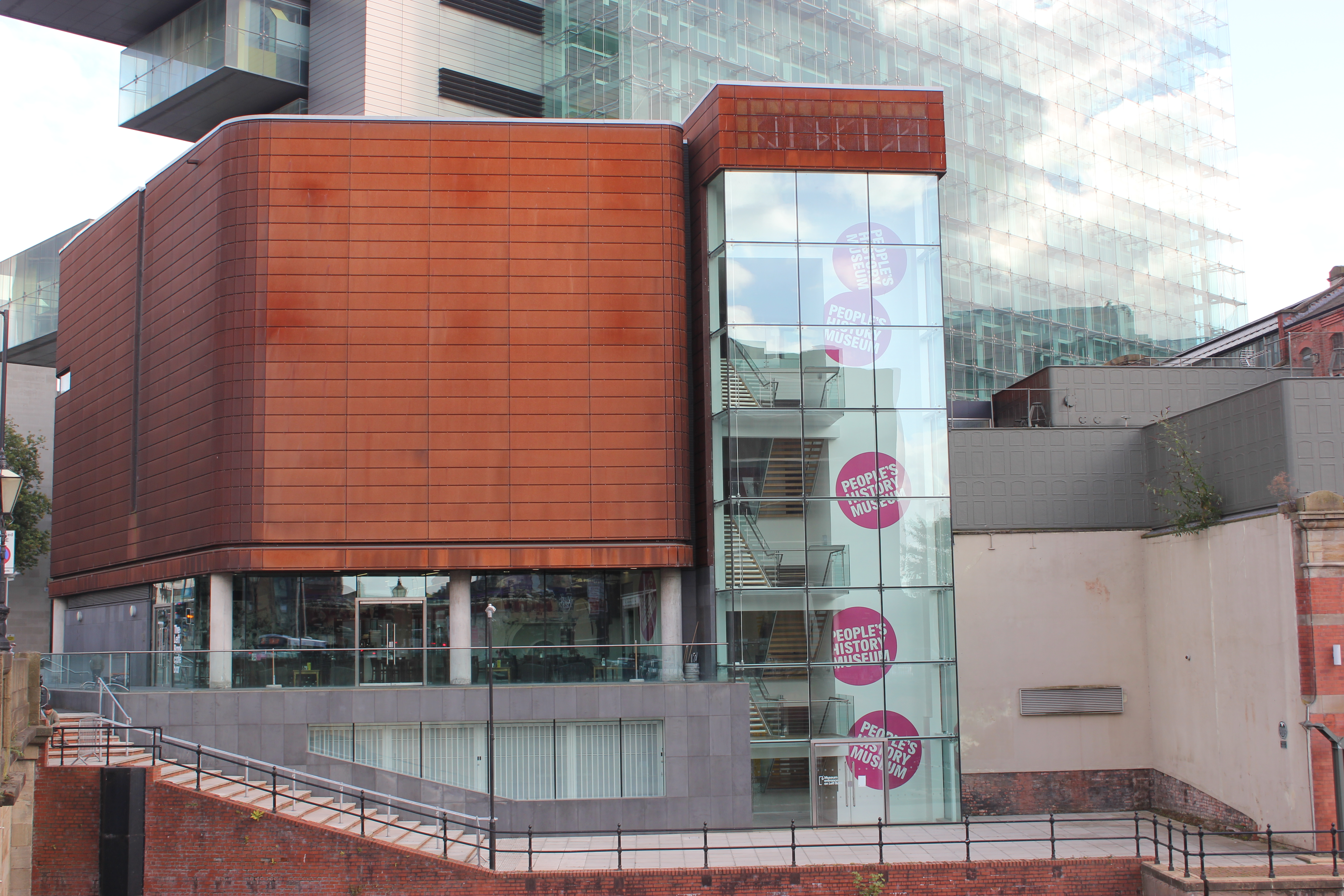
The People's History Museum, as viewed from across the River Irwell in Salford

The Trade Union, Labour and Co-operative History Society operated a collection at Limehouse Town Hall between 1975 and 1986. The museum moved to Manchester and re-opened in 1990 at the Grade II* listed former Mechanics' Institute at 103 Princess Street.

In 1994, the museum opened the Pump House People's History Museum containing a public gallery at the present site on Bridge Street. The two sites were renamed the People's History Museum (PHM) in 2001. The Bridge Street site closed for a £12.5 million redevelopment in October 2007. The redevelopment included the refurbishment of the existing Pump House and the construction of a four-storey extension alongside it. A glass walkway was constructed to link the two buildings. The museum reopened on 13 February 2010.

== Collection ==
The PHM holds one of the largest collections of political material in Britain, beginning with the early 19th century. It focuses on the history of democracy with objects relating to the right to vote making up a large part of the objects on display. The collection includes 2,000 posters focused on elections and political campaigns, 300 political cartoons, 7,000 trade union badges and tokens, as well as 95,000 photographs. With over 400 trade union and political banners, the PHM holds the largest banner collection in the world and visitors to the museum can see banners being conserved in Main Gallery Two in the Textile Conservation studio.

The museum actively collects contemporary material; it has tried to find and acquire, among other things, the EdStone upon which Labour engraved their six main manifesto pledges in the 2015 general election, and the copy of Mao's Little Red Book which shadow chancellor John McDonnell threw across the House of Commons despatch box at George Osborne. Through projects such as "Play Your Part", the museum makes the historic collections relevant to present day issues.

The PHM also houses the Labour History Archive and Study Centre, an important archive of material relating to the history of working people in Britain. Its collections include the archives of the Labour Party, the former Communist Party of Great Britain, the co-operative movement and the Department for Work and Pensions. It also contains documents relating to Chartism, general elections, the First World War, women's suffrage and the 1984–1985 miners' strike.
