= Resource-based learning =

Resource-based learning (RBL) is an approach to pedagogy which actively involves students, teachers and resource providers in the application of a range of resources (both human and non-human) in the learning process. It is claimed that this approach offers a flexible structure to learning such that the learner can develop as a learner according to their "varied interests, experiences, learning styles, needs and ability levels". The RBL approach focuses on the resources available to the learners and how the learners interact with these resources. This leads to an interest in the uses of technology to support and develop a learning environment.

== Background ==
The exigencies of the Second World War impelled the training of large numbers of both military and civilian staff, and in the United Kingdom this led to the adoption of B. F. Skinner's operant conditioning as a strategy for achieving the requisite behaviour modification. By the 1950s and 1960s these stimulus-response methods were introduced into education, but were seen as being too mechanical. The response was a move to more cognitivist and constructivist approaches. In 1966 the Nuffield Foundation introduced the Resources for Learning project. This involved the teacher introducing a problem, the pupils formulating a hypothesis and then the pupils designing and carrying out an experiment. Kim Taylor an ex-headmaster soon took over as Director of the project. However experience soon showed that a more instructional approach was better at being effective. This led to greater reliance on instructional design. This involved consideration of the scientific principles of pedagogy as well as attention to the equipment to be used to present the resources, which was seen as having managerial implications. Kim Taylor wrote Resources for Learning, (1971), which predicted significant changes if resource-based methods were to be effectively deployed. One of the issues he highlighted was that as a modern economy created pressure for a universalised education, which would require a shift away from "teacher-as-craftsman" as the situation would generate a significant short-fall in teachers. The "Nuffield solution" involved a transition from a craft-based model of teaching to a more industrial approach where greater attention is paid to the managerial effectiveness and the quality of the educational resources.
