= David Medd =

British architect, lecturer, and writer

- Born: David Leslie Medd; 5 November 1917
- Died: 10 April 2009 (aged 91)
- Education: Oundle School
- Occupation: Architect
- Spouse: Mary Medd
- Practice: Hertfordshire county Ministry of Education

David Leslie Medd (5 November 1917 – 10 April 2009) was a British architect, lecturer, and writer.

== Early life and education ==
Medd was born in Elswick, Lancashire in 1917. He attended Oundle School and later joined the Architectural Association (AA) in 1936 upon recommendation from his uncle, Henry Medd, and guidance from designer Gordon Russell. At the Architectural Association, he met Mary Crowley, and both had the opportunity to work under architects such Berthold Lubetkin and Ernö Goldfinger.

== Career ==
After qualifying in 1941, Medd served at the Camouflage Development and Training Centre in Farnham with Stirrat Johnson-Marshall. During the post-war period, they collaborated to address the educational infrastructure needs of Hertfordshire, which experienced a population surge. Along with education officer John Newsom, they explored innovative design philosophies to adapt to the teaching advancements of the time.

Medd further contributed to the Ministry of Education's prefabrication initiative, working along with Hills of West Bromwich to develop a modular primary school design based on an 8ft 3in grid.

In 1949, Medd and Crowley joined Johnson-Marshall at the Ministry of Education, working on prototype school structures. They further transitioned to designing brick buildings, emphasizing efficient space use for diverse teaching needs. One such design was the village school at Finmere, which introduced flexible, mixed-age teaching spaces, later implemented in urban settings.

The Eveline Lowe school in London, co-designed with John Kay in 1964-6, reflected Medd's preference for segmented spaces, prioritizing natural light and ventilation. Its design provided an alternative to the prevalent urban tower blocks.

Medd received an OBE in 1964. In his later years, Medd engaged in a documentary project comparing his architectural contributions with modern designs.

== Collections ==
In 1998 the Institute of Education received the papers of David Medd and Mary Medd, which had previously been held at Bishop Grossteste College. In subsequent years the collection was added to by Medd until his death in 2008. University College London also holds the archive of the Architects and Building Branch (for whom David and Mary Medd worked), and the archive of educators George and Judith Baines who collaborated with the Medds.
