= Neil Fletcher (politician) =

British trade unionist (born 1944)

(Peter) Neil Fletcher (born 5 May 1944) was a Labour politician and the last Leader of the Inner London Education Authority before its abolition.

== Early life ==
Fletcher was born in Blackpool and attended Wyggeston Grammar School for Boys. He trained to be a teacher and taught in schools in Leeds for two years before becoming a Lecturer in further education in Harrow and Merton in the early 1970s. He was active in his trade union and was appointed as Principal Administration Officer for NALGO in 1976.

== London government ==
Fletcher was elected to Camden London Borough Council in 1978 for the Kilburn ward along with Ken Livingstone who he became allied to in Labour politics. He served as Deputy Leader of the Council from 1982 to 1984. From 1979 he was chosen as Camden's delegate to the Inner London Education Authority. When the left took over in 1981 he became Chairman of the Further and Higher Education Sub-Committee of ILEA after failing to win the Deputy Leadership.

== Leadership ==
When ILEA was turned into a directly elected body in 1986, Fletcher stood down from Camden and was elected as ILEA member for Holborn and St Pancras. In 1987 Fletcher challenged Frances Morrell who had become unpopular with the teaching unions over staffing issues, and defeated her for the leadership by 23 votes to 22. His leadership was seen as being to the left of Mrs Morrell's, but was dominated by the fight to stop ILEA's abolition. By 1987, abolition was being openly advocated by many leading Conservatives to the appreciative ears of Prime Minister Margaret Thatcher. Eventually, backbench Conservative MPs forced the issue by putting down an amendment to get rid of ILEA, and the government announced that it would go before the next elections (scheduled for 1990).

The defence of ILEA followed the same track as had been followed, unsuccessfully, in the defence of the GLC. A postal ballot of parents of ILEA school children in April 1988 found 95% opposed to abolition. The House of Lords were lobbied, but without success. With the government having little difficulty in seeing abolition of ILEA passed into law, it ceased to exist on 1 April 1990.

== Later posts ==
In 1991 Fletcher accepted a promotion at NALGO to be Education Officer. Later in the 1990s he became Head of Education Policy for the Local Government Association.

Preceded by Frances Morrell	Leader of the Inner London Education Authority; 1987–1990	Succeeded by (ILEA abolished)
