= Barbara Hulme =

English botanist (1930–2020)

- Born: 1930; York, England
- Died: 2020 (aged 89–90); Cornwall, England
- Education: University of Edinburgh, Scotland
- Known for: Botany: First to produce experimental hybrids in the genus Atriplex

Barbara Hulme (née Poulter; 1930–2020) was a botanist, credited with being the first to produce experimental hybrids in the genus Atriplex (also known as saltbush or orache), a genus of wild flower common on seaside strandlines. The Canadian botanist Pierre Michel Taschereau would later name the Atriplex × hulmeana hybrid after her.

== Early life and education ==
Born in York, Barbara attended Tang Hall Junior School in the Heworth area of the city, before gaining a scholarship to attend Queen Anne Grammar School.

== University and research ==
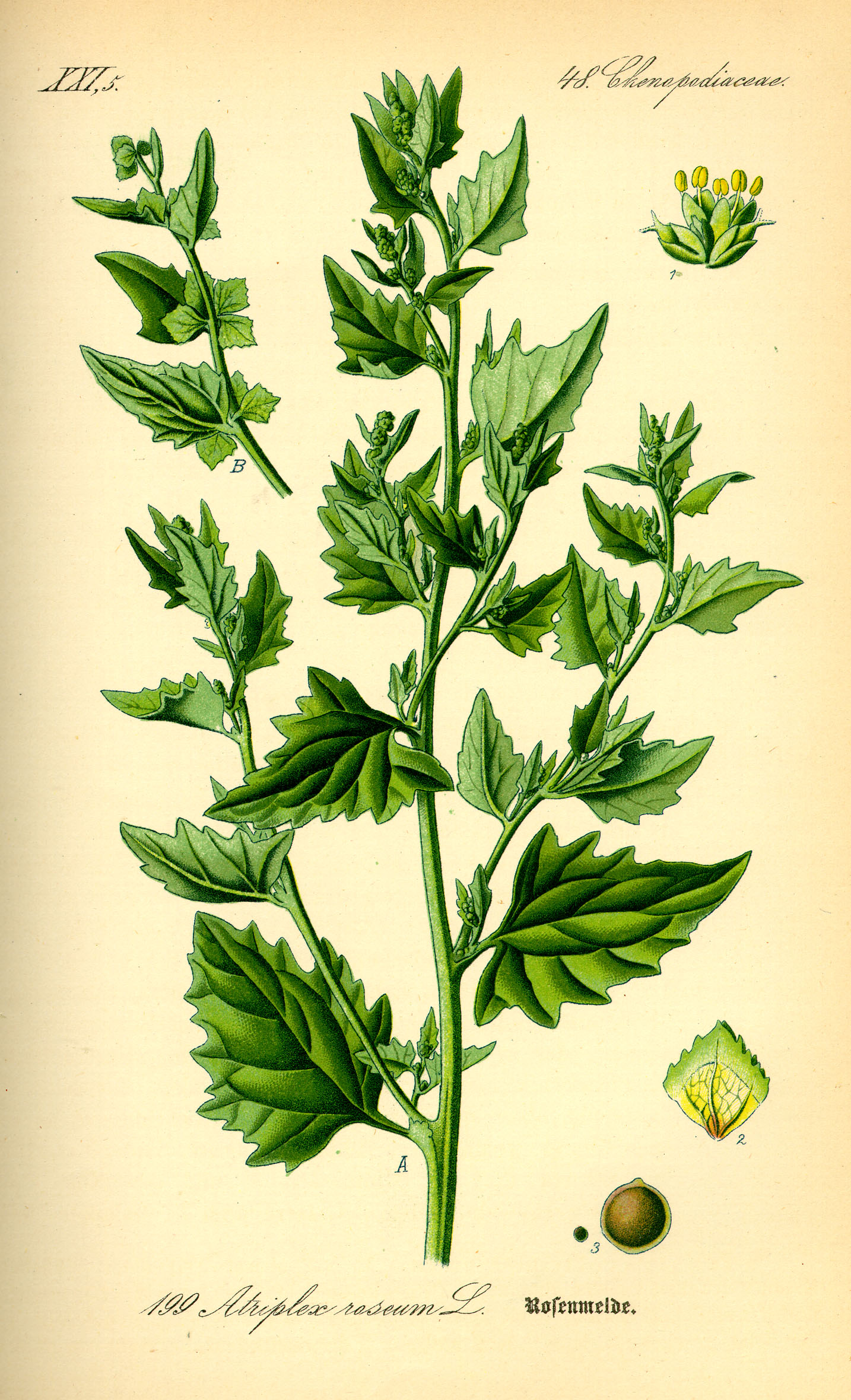
Atriplex is a plant genus of 250–300 species, in the family Amaranthaceae.

Barbara studied botany at the University of Edinburgh from 1948 where she achieved a first class degree. She stayed on to study for a PhD, which she gained in 1957. Her thesis was entitled "Studies on some British species of Atriplex L", in which she clarified the classification of four british Atriplex species, performed cultivation studies including hybridization, and revealed that many of the traits used for classification are genetically determined but can be influenced by environmental factors. She also assisted botanist Peter Hadland Davis in his study of the flora of Turkey.

== Marriage and later life ==
It was also during her time at Edinburgh that she met her future husband Ken Hulme, who was then working as a foreman at the Royal Botanical Gardens Edinburgh. The couple married in 1955 and moved first to Birmingham, where Barbara finished writing up her thesis, and then to the Wirral in 1957, where Ken had become the first Director at Ness Gardens, University of Liverpool. After the birth of her three children, Barbara's life revolved around caring for them and other family members but her interest in plants stayed with her for the rest of her life, and many of her holidays with Ken, including a trip to China to attend a symposium about botanic gardens, revolved around plants and gardens.
