= Frances Morrell =

British politician

- Born: Frances Maine Galleway; 28 December 1937
- Died: 10 January 2010 (aged 72)
- Education: University of Hull
- Occupation: Labour Party politician
- Known for: Inner London Education Authority

Frances Morrell (née Frances Maine Galleway; 28 December 1937 – 10 January 2010) was a British Labour politician who led the Inner London Education Authority from 1983 until 1987.

== Life and career ==
Frances Morrell was brought up in York, and educated at that city's Queen Anne Grammar School and at Hull University. Much later she undertook an MA at Goldsmiths College, London University. She worked as a schoolteacher from 1960, and married Brian Morrell in 1964. In 1970 she became a Press Officer, working for the Fabian Society and the National Union of Students. This latter role brought her into contact with Tony Benn, who was soon to be seen as the leader of the Labour left, and with whom she at that time agreed on many important issues.

In 1973, Benn invited Morrell to be his political adviser were Labour to win the next election. She was Labour candidate for Chelmsford at the February 1974 general election, and served as a Special Adviser to Benn at the Departments of Industry and Energy from 1974 to 1979. Benn was increasingly marginalised as the Parliament went on, but Morrell worked to link him with a network of activists outside Parliament. She sought nomination as Labour parliamentary candidate for several Labour-held constituencies before the 1979 general election (among them Birkenhead and Manchester Blackley), but was unsuccessful in all cases.

After Labour left office she helped to create the Rank and File Mobilising Committee, through which the left organised to bring changes in the party. In this capacity she was referred to cynically by some in the media: Private Eye commented "How typical of Tony Benn to have a hatchet-woman". The Eye also published a Clerihew: "Frances Morrell / Has done very well / To be leader of the ILEA / Without being black, working class or gay." In the run-up to the 1981 Greater London Council (GLC) elections she was chosen to fight Islington South and Finsbury, and on election formed part of the GLC's left faction in support of Ken Livingstone.

However, Morrell's background as a teacher led her to spend most time on the Inner London Education Authority (ILEA), membership of which came with membership of the GLC representing an inner borough. She was chosen as Deputy Leader of the new left leadership of the ILEA under Bryn Davies. She became unsatisfied with his leadership, which she considered weak, and built support for a change through the GLC Women's Group; in April 1983 she challenged him and was elected as the new leader.

Under Morrell, the ILEA became concerned with promoting gender equality. The authority was severely criticised for what the right wing regarded as propaganda in the schools the ILEA administered. Many of the policies of the Davies leadership were continued, which included the high spending: the ILEA deliberately set an illegally high budget for 1985. The government under Prime Minister Margaret Thatcher, which was proposing to abolish the GLC, would have wanted to abolish the ILEA as well, but found it was impractical to do so. However, new legislation allowed the Government to limit the ILEA's budget, and it did so. The ILEA was helped by a bail-out from the GLC for one year.

The abolition of the GLC in 1986 also meant something had to be done to provide for future elections to the ILEA. It was first suggested that the ILEA could be made up of delegates from the 12 inner London Boroughs, but the Conservative group on the ILEA was strongly against this idea; eventually it was decided that there would be direct elections. Morrell led Labour into the campaign, and with London public opinion hostile to the abolition of the GLC, Labour won an easy victory. Morrell herself was re-elected quite narrowly, for the SDP made a strong challenge.

Morrell lost her leadership in 1987 by 23 votes to 22, continuing a tradition of internal deselection established by both her predecessors. She had insisted that teachers who were surplus to requirements at one ILEA school should transfer to another where there was a shortage, and threatened to dismiss those who refused. She became secretary of the Speaker of the House of Commons' Commission on Citizenship the next year and a senior research fellow at Queen Mary and Westfield College briefly in 1991–92, before becoming executive director of the Institute for Citizenship Studies.

She was joint chief executive of ArtsInform, which she set up with Linda Payne in 1995 to build relationships between schools and colleges with professional artists and arts organisations.

=== Personal life and death ===
Morrell's husband Brian committed suicide in April 2009, and she herself suffered from increasingly poor health. She died from cancer on 10 January 2010, at the age of 72. She was survived by her daughter, Daisy, and brother, Peter.

Preceded by Bryn Davies	Leader of the Inner London Education Authority; 1983–1987	Succeeded by Neil Fletcher
