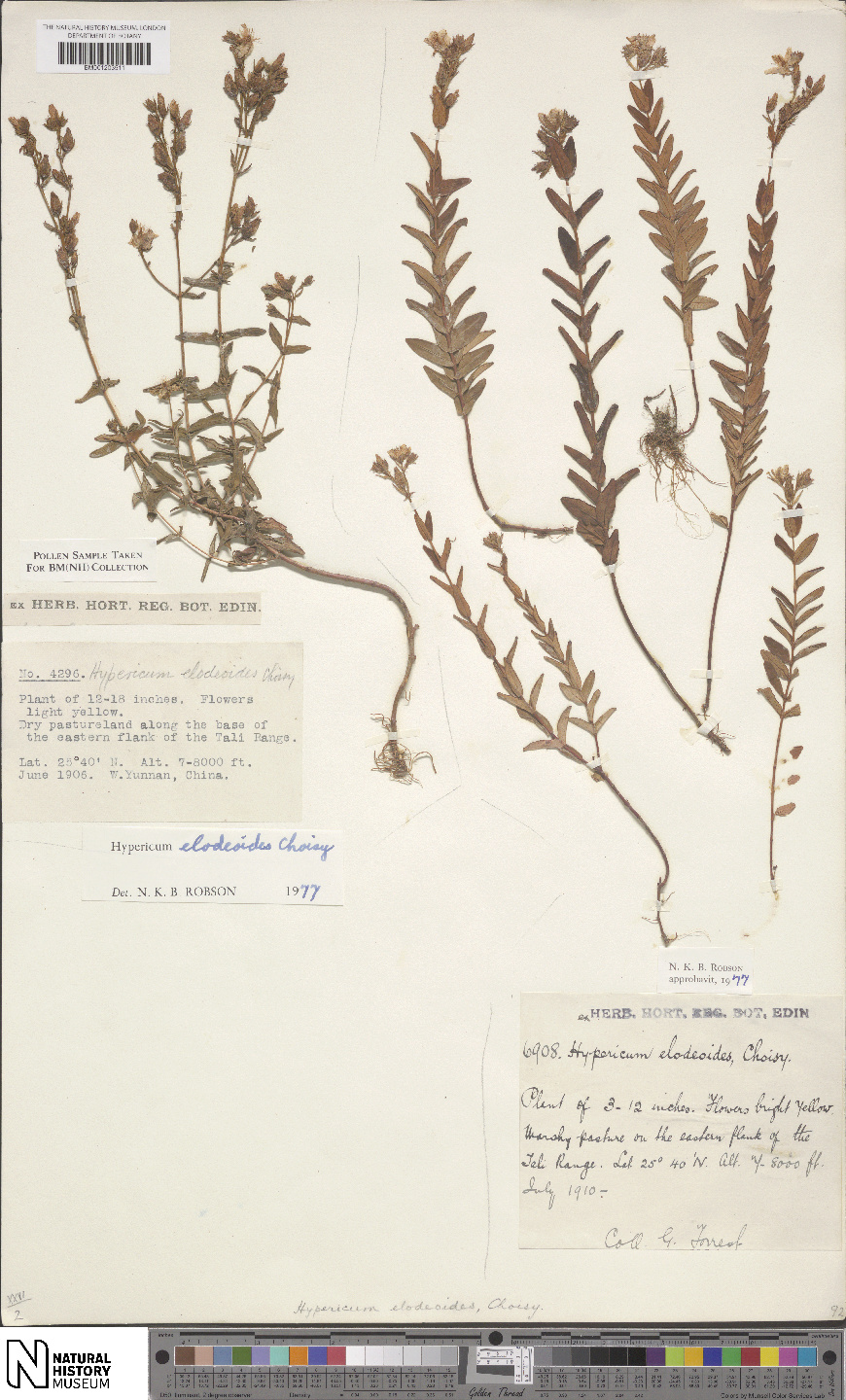

Scientific classification
- Kingdom: Plantae
- Clade: Embryophytes
- Clade: Tracheophytes
- Clade: Angiosperms
- Clade: Eudicots
- Clade: Rosids
- Order: Malpighiales
- Family: Hypericaceae
- Genus: Hypericum
- Section: Hypericum sect. Elodeoida
- Species: H. elodeoides

Binomial name
- Hypericum elodeoides Choisy

Subspecies
- Hypericum elodeoides subsp. elodeoides Choisy; Hypericum elodeoides subsp. wardii N. Robson

Synonyms
- Hypericum adenophorum Wall. ex Dyer; Hypericum napaulense Choisy; Hypericum nervosum D. Don; Hypericum pallens D. Don

= Hypericum elodeoides =

Species of flowering plant of the St. John's wort family

Hypericum elodeoides, commonly called the Himalayan St. John's Wort, is a species of flowering plant of the St. John's wort family (Hypericaceae).

== Description ==
Hypericum elodeoides is a perennial herb which usually grows 0.15–0.5 metres (5.9–19.7 in) tall, but can grow as tall as 0.73 metres (29 in). It grows upright and erect, sometimes from a creeping and rooting base.

=== Stems ===
Hypericum elodeoides has stems which grow in a caespitose pattern, which means they are densely clustered in a mat-like manner. They are unbranched or have very few branches which are wand-like (virgate) in appearance. Cross-sections of the stems are roughly circular (terete), and they lack glands. The distance between the points of attachments of the leaves is 5–35 millimetres (0.20–1.38 in), which is usually shorter than the leaves themselves.

=== Leaves ===
The leaves of Hypericum elodeoides are sessile; the blades of the leaf connect directly to the stem. The leaf blade measures 10–50 millimetres (0.39–1.97 in) by 4–12 millimetres (0.16–0.47 in) in size. Their shape varies, but is usually lanceolate: long, slightly wider in the middle, and shaped like the tip of a lance. The blade's texture is thickly papery, and on the underside they are paler in color. The plane or margins of the leaves curve downwards. Their tip is usually pointed and acute, but it can rarely be obtuse to rounded. The edges of the leaves are smooth and are not toothed or lobed, but can have hairs with enlarged glands towards the base of the blade. The base of the leaf, where the blade attaches to the stem, can vary in shape from heart-shaped to rounded. The upper side of this base usually has glandular auricles which clasp the point of attachment.

The laminar glands (those on the blade of the leaf) are pale in color and densely packed. They are large and their shape is that of dots or short streaks. The intramarginal glands, on the other hand, are black in color and very sparse. Each leaf will usually have three pairs of main lateral veins, but can sometimes only have two. These run from the lower third to fifth of the midrib, and can be seen prominently from below the leaf. The net of small tertiary veins is lax.

=== Inflorescence ===
Hypericum elodeoides typically has between five and thirty flowers on each inflorescence, but can have as few as one. These flowers usually grow from one node, but this number could be as high as four. These inflorescences are shaped in a corymb or cylinder, and can very rarely have flowering branches from one to two nodes below.

The pedicels are 3–12 millimetres (0.12–0.47 in) long. The bracts are of a similar lance-like shape to the regular leaves, but can be more linear. Their edges have black glands and small hairs, or can very rarely be entirely smooth and without auricles.

Each flower is 10–20 millimetres (0.39–0.79 in) in diameter, and is stellate with ellipse-shaped buds. They have between five and nine sepals, which measure 5–9 millimetres (0.20–0.35 in) by 1–3 millimetres (0.039–0.118 in) in size. They are free and equal, erect when budding and in fruit. They have a narrow lance-like shape and are acute on their ends, with glands and small hairs. They have five unbranched veins which can are prominent and easy to identify. They have glands which are pale or black and consist of small dots or lines. Around the edges, these glands are black and less numerous.

The flowers have five golden yellow petals, which are not tinged red when budding. Each petal is 7–15 millimetres (0.28–0.59 in) by 3–4 millimetres (0.12–0.16 in) in size. They have smooth edges and glands which are usually black. Each flower with have around sixty stamens, the longest of which are 8–11 millimetres (0.31–0.43 in) long. The anther gland of the stamen is black. The ovaries have three locii, and they are 2–4 millimetres (0.079–0.157 in) by 1.3–1.7 millimetres (0.051–0.067 in). They each have three styles which are roughly twice as long as the ovaries.

The seed capsule is 5–8 millimetres (0.20–0.31 in) by 4–5.5 millimetres (0.16–0.22 in) and of an ovoid shape. The seeds are a yellow-brown color and 0.5–0.6 millimetres (0.020–0.024 in) long.

== Taxonomy ==
The placement of H. elodeoides within Hypericum can be summarized as follows:

Hypericum

Hypericum subg. Hypericum

Hypericum sect. Elodeoida

H. austroyunnanicum
H. elodeoides
H. hubeiense
H. kingdonii
H. petiolulatum
H. qinlingense
H. seniawinii
