= Architects and Building Branch =

British government school design and construction branch

The Architects and Building Branch was a branch of the Ministry of Education in the United Kingdom, formed in 1949 in the aftermath of World War II. It was created through the merger of the ministry's Architects Branch and Buildings and Priority Branch. The branch was established as part of the government's effort to centralise the construction of school buildings in order to reduce costs and improve standards.

Postwar rationing limited the availability of building materials and required school rebuilding and new construction programmes to be phased and carefully managed. The branch brought together administrative staff and professional architects in a multidisciplinary organisation.

== Structure ==
The branch began as a team of territorial architects and was later divided into Territorial and Development sections, headed by Stirrat Marshall-Johnson and Anthony Pott, respectively. The Territorial section worked with local authorities and private architects on the approval of school plans. Its work was often highly technical and involved site visits as well as consultation with educational advisers.

The Development section investigated technical and educational issues and designed and built schools for local authorities. In effect, it functioned as an action research body whose findings were applied by the Territorial architects. Its work was used as a reference point both within the branch and internationally. Areas of investigation included buildings, furniture, components, and publications. Research visits were made outside the United Kingdom, including to France, the Netherlands, and Germany.

== Activities ==
The branch designed and built around 30 educational buildings during its period of operation. It was noted for placing the child at the centre of the design process. The branch commissioned some of the earliest measurements of schoolchildren in order to design spaces and furniture intended to support children's learning.

The branch was involved in the design of all parts of a school building, including ironmongery, light fittings, furniture, heating, and outdoor play areas. It worked closely with local authorities and other organisations, including the Furniture Industry Research Association, to ensure that its designs were suited to their intended use. It also developed close links with HM Inspectorate of Schools.

== Personnel ==
Notable individuals associated with the branch include:

- Stirrat Marshall Johnson
- Anthony Pott
- David Medd
- Mary Medd
- Tony Branton

== Archives and collections ==
The photographic archive of the Architects and Building Branch, Ministry of Education and its successors, is held by Special Collections at University College London, including the archives of the Institute of Education. The collection comprises 90 boxes and covers the 1940s to the 1980s. It includes photographs of school and college buildings across the United Kingdom.

University College London also holds the papers of David Medd and Mary Medd, both of whom worked for the Architects and Building Branch.

The National Archives holds the records of the Architects and Building Branch of the Ministry of Education.
