= Mary Medd =

British architect (1907–2005)

Mary Beaumont Medd
- Born: Mary Beaumont Crowley; 4 August 1907
- Died: 6 June 2005 (aged 97)
- Education: Bedales School
- Occupation: Architect
- Spouse: David Medd
- Practice: Hertfordshire county Ministry of Education

Mary Beaumont Medd (née Crowley, 4 August 1907 - 6 June 2005) was a British architect, known for public buildings including schools. Medd was the first architect to be employed by Hertfordshire county council.

== Early life and education ==
Medd was the daughter of Ralph Henry Crowley (1869–1953), who worked as Chief Medical Officer in the Ministry of Education. After education at home, she spent one year at an experimental school run by Isabel Fry, and then was at Bedales School from 1921 to 1926 where she became Head Girl.

After attending a finishing school in Switzerland, in 1927 Medd trained at the Architectural Association School of Architecture. She studied alongside Jessica Albery, Justin Blanco White, and Judith Ledeboer where they developed a commitment to housing reform and social concerns which impacted their future careers.

== Career ==
As Mary Crowley, working with Cecil George Kemp, she designed three houses at 102, 104 and 106 Orchard Road, Tewin, Hertfordshire, in 1935–36.

In 1941, John Newsom, Hertfordshire's education officer, hired her as the first architect to be employed by Hertfordshire County Council. She later met her husband David Leslie Medd (1917–2009), when she was part of the team of architects commissioned to build schools in Hertfordshire after World War II. They married on 11 April 1949, and always worked together after this, becoming leading school designers in England and Wales.

National Life Stories conducted an oral history interview (C467/29) with Mary Medd in 1998 for its Architects Lives' collection held by the British Library.

Mary Medd died on 6 June 2005 in Woolmer Green, Hertfordshire.

== Collections ==
In 1998 the Institute of Education received the papers of David Medd and Mary Medd, which had previously been held at Bishop Grossteste College. In subsequent years the collection was added to by Medd until his death in 2008. University College London also holds the archive of the Architects and Building Branch (for whom David and Mary Medd worked), and the archive of educators George and Judith Baines who collaborated with the Medds.
