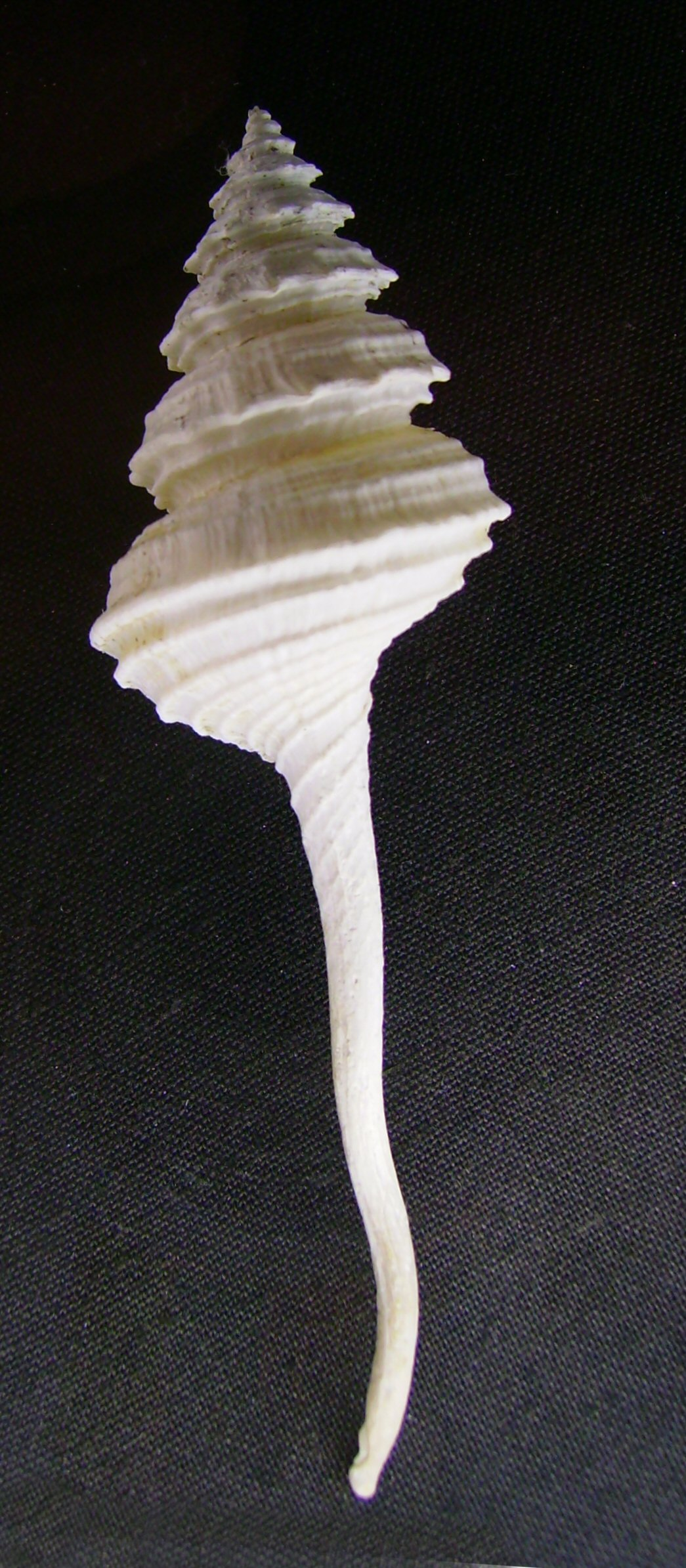
- A shell of Columbarium wormaldi

Scientific classification
- Kingdom: Animalia
- Phylum: Mollusca
- Class: Gastropoda
- Subclass: Caenogastropoda
- Order: Neogastropoda
- Family: Columbariidae
- Genus: Columbarium von Martens, 1881

Type species
- Pleurotoma (Columbarium) spinicinctum Martens, 1881

Synonyms
- Pleurotoma (Columbarium) Martens, 1881

= Columbarium (gastropod) =

Genus of gastropods

Columbarium is a genus of deepwater sea snails, marine gastropod molluscs in the family Columbariidae, the pagoda shells.

The shells of most species in this family have a long siphonal canal and a noticeable peripheral keel.

== Distribution ==
The genus Columbarium survives as a Recent group in the Indo-Pacific, where it primarily inhabits deep waters that range from southeast Africa to Japan, Australia, and northern New Zealand. It also has a rich fossil record, appearing in the Maastrichtian and Paleocene of Europe, the upper Eocene and upper Miocene of southern Australia, and the lower Eocene of the southern United States.

== Species ==
Species within the genus Columbarium include:

- † Columbarium acanthostephes (Tate, 1888)
- Columbarium alfi Thach, 2020
- † Columbarium antecedens Pacaud, 2015
- Columbarium ashleyfieldi Y. Zheng & S. J. Maxwell, 2025
- Columbarium bullatum (Dall, 1927)
- † Columbarium calcaratum Darragh, 1969
- † Columbarium cochleatum (Tate, 1888)
- Columbarium corollaceoum Zhang, 2003
- Columbarium cossignanii Thach, 2024
- † Columbarium echinatum Darragh, 1969
- Columbarium formosissimum Tomlin, 1928
- Columbarium harrisae Harasewych, 1986
- Columbarium hedleyi Iredale, 1936
- Columbarium hystriculum Iredale, 1936
- † Columbarium kaunhoweni (H. J. Finlay, 1927)
- Columbarium natalense Tomlin, 1928
- Columbarium pagoda Lesson, 1831
- Columbarium pagodoides (Watson, 1882)
- † Columbarium pataka Maxwell, 1978
- Columbarium quadrativaricosum Harasewych, 2004
- † Columbarium rugatoides Darragh, 1997
- Columbarium sinense Zhang, 2003
- Columbarium spinicinctum von Martens, 1881
- † Columbarium spinulatum Cossmann, 1901
- Columbarium suzukii Habe & Kosuge, 1972
- Columbarium tomicici J. H. McLean & H. Andrade, 1982
- † Columbarium uniliratum Darragh, 1969
- Columbarium veridicum Dell, 1963
- † Columbarium vulneratum (Finlay & Marwick, 1937)
- Columbarium vulsum Darragh, 1969 †

Synonyms:

- Columbarium aapta Harasewych, 1986 is a synonym of Coluzea aapta Harasewych, 1986
- Columbarium altocanalis (Dell, 1956): synonym of Coluzea altocanalis Dell, 1956
- Columbarium angulare Barnard, 1959 is a synonym of Coluzea angularis (Barnard, 1959)
- Columbarium atlantis Clench & Aguayo, 1938 is a synonym of Histricosceptrum atlantis (Clench & Aguayo, 1938)
- Columbarium aurora Bayer, 1971 is a synonym of Peristarium aurora (Bayer, 1971)
- Columbarium bartletti Clench & Aguayo, 1940 is a synonym of Histricosceptrum bartletti (Clench & Aguayo, 1940)
- Columbarium benthocallis Melvill & Standen, 1907is a synonym of Fulgurofusus benthocallis (Melvill & Standen, 1907)
- Columbarium bermudezi Clench & Aguayo, 1938 is a synonym of Fulgurofusus bermudezi (Clench & Aguayo, 1938)
- Columbarium berthae Monsecour & Kreipl, 2003 is a synonym of Coluzea berthae (Monsecour & Kreipl, 2003)
- Columbarium brayi Clench, 1959 is a synonym of Fulgurofusus brayi (Clench, 1959)
- Columbarium canaliculatum Martens, 1901 is a synonym of Coluzea canaliculatum (Martens, 1901)
- Columbarium congulatum Martens, 1901 is a synonym of Coluzea cingulata (Martens, 1901)
- Columbarium coronatum Penna-Neme & Leme, 1978 is a synonym of Coronium coronatum (Penna-Neme & Leme, 1978)
- Columbarium distephanotis Melvill, 1891 is a synonym of Coluzea distephanotis (Melvill, 1891)
- Columbarium eastwoodae Kilburn, 1971 is a synonym of Coluzea eastwoodae (Kilburn, 1971)
- Columbarium electra Bayer, 1971is a synonym of Peristarium electra (Bayer, 1971)
- Columbarium juliae is a synonym of Coluzea juliae Harasewych, 1989
- Columbarium mariae (Powell, 1952): synonym of Coluzea mariae A. W. B. Powell, 1952
- Columbarium merope Bayer, 1971 is a synonym of Peristarium merope (Bayer, 1971)
- Columbarium radiale is a synonym of Coluzea radialis (Watson, 1882)
- Columbarium rotundum Barnard, 1959 is a synonym of Coluzea rotunda (Barnard, 1959)
- Columbarium spiralis (A. Adams, 1856): synonym of Coluzea spiralis (A. Adams, 1856) (junior subjective synonym)
- Columbarium subcontractum (G. B. Sowerby III, 1902): synonym of Coluzea subcontracta (G. B. Sowerby III, 1902)
- Columbarium suteri E.A. Smith, 1915 is a synonym of Coluzea spiralis (A. Adams, 1856)
- Columbarium trabeatum Iredale, 1936 is a synonym of Columbarium hedleyi Iredale, 1936
- Columbarium wormaldi Powell, 1971: synonym of Coluzea wormaldi A. W. B. Powell, 1971 (superseded combination)
