= Fulgurofusus =

Scientific classification
- Kingdom: Animalia
- Phylum: Mollusca
- Class: Gastropoda
- Subclass: Caenogastropoda
- Order: Neogastropoda
- Family: Columbariidae
- Genus: Fulgurofusus; Grabau, 1904

Synonyms
- Fulgurofusus (Fulgurofusus) Grabau, 1904· accepted, alternate representation; Fulgurofusus (Histricosceptrum) Darragh, 1969· accepted, alternate representation; Histricosceptrum Darragh, 1969

Genus of gastropods

Fulgurofusus is a genus of sea snails in the family Columbariidae.

== Species ==
Species within the genus Fulgurofusus include:

- Fulgurofusus atlantis (Clench & Aguayo, 1938)
- Fulgurofusus bartletti (Clench & Aguayo, 1940)
- Fulgurofusus bermudezi (Clench & Aguayo, 1938)
- Fulgurofusus brayi (Clench, 1959)
- Fulgurofusus ecphoroides Harasewych, 1983
- Fulgurofusus electra (F. M. Bayer, 1971)
- Fulgurofusus jonasi J.C. Nascimento de Barros, Ebenezer dos Santos Silva, F. de Almeida Alves-Junior, 2018
- Fulgurofusus marshalli Harasewych, 2011
- Fulgurofusus maxwelli Harasewych, 2011
- Fulgurofusus merope (F. M. Bayer, 1971)
- Fulgurofusus nanshaensis Zhang, 2003
- † Fulgurofusus quercollis (Harris, 1896)
- Fulgurofusus sarissophorus (Watson, 1882)
- Fulgurofusus tomicici McLean & Andrade, 1982
- Fulgurofusus xenismatis Harasewych, 1983

Species brought into synonymy

- Fulgurofusus aequilonius Sysoev, 2000: synonym of Tropidofusus aequilonius (Sysoev, 2000) (original combination)
- Fulgurofusus benthocallis (Melvill & Standen, 1907): synonym of Tropidofusus benthocallis (Melvill & Standen, 1907)
- Fulgurofusus timor Harasewych, 1983 : synonym of Peristarium timor (Harasewych, 1983)
