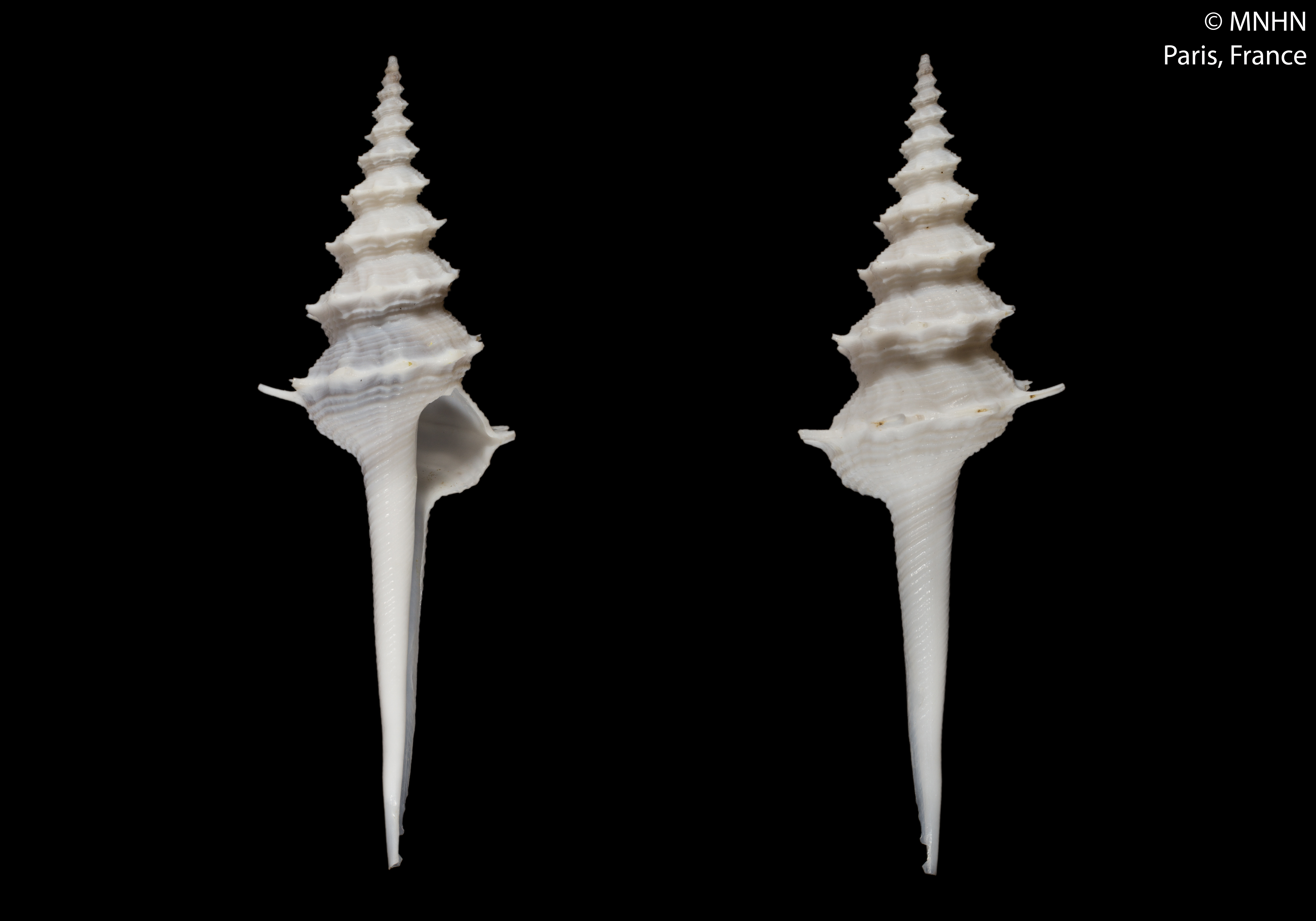
- Shell of Coluzea berthae

Scientific classification
- Kingdom: Animalia
- Phylum: Mollusca
- Class: Gastropoda
- Subclass: Caenogastropoda
- Order: Neogastropoda
- Family: Columbariidae
- Genus: Coluzea; Finlay [in Allan], 1926

Type species
- †Fusus dentatus Hutton, 1877

Synonyms
- Columbarium (Coluzea) Finlay [in Allan], 1926; Coluzea Finlay, 1926

= Coluzea =

Genus of gastropods

Coluzea is a genus of sea snails in the family Columbariidae.

== Distribution ==
Coluzea has a distinct geographic history. Its New Zealand lineage extends continuously from the lower Oligocene to the present day. Additionally, Coluzea occurs as a fossil in the Eocene and lower Oligocene of Europe, and it persists as a Recent taxon in the waters of South Africa.

== Species ==
As of 2020, species within the genus Coluzea include:

- Coluzea aapta Harasewych, 1986
- Coluzea altocanalis Dell, 1956
- Coluzea angularis (Barnard, 1959)
- Coluzea berthae (Monsecour & Kreipl, 2003)
- Coluzea bimurata Darragh, 1987
- Coluzea canaliculatum (Martens, 1901)
- Coluzea cingulata (Martens, 1901)
- †Coluzea climacota (Suter, 1917)
- †Coluzea dentata (Hutton, 1877)
- Coluzea distephanotis (Melvill, 1891)
- Coluzea eastwoodae (Kilburn, 1971)
- Coluzea faceta Harasewych, 1991
- Coluzea gomphos Harasewych, 1986
- Coluzea groschi Harasewych & Fraussen, 2001
- Coluzea icarus Harasewych, 1986
- Coluzea juliae Harasewych, 1989
- Coluzea kallistropha Harasewych, 2004
- †Coluzea kiosk Finlay, 1930
- Coluzea liriope Harasewych, 1986
- †Coluzea macrior Finlay, 1930
- Coluzea madagascarensis Harasewych, 2004
- †Coluzea maoria (P. Marshall & Murdoch, 1919)
- Coluzea mariae Powell, 1952
- Coluzea naxa Harasewych, 2004
- †Coluzea paucispinosa Finlay, 1930
- Coluzea radialis (Watson, 1882)
- Coluzea rosadoi Bozzetti, 2006
- Coluzea rotunda (Barnard, 1959)
- †Coluzea spectabilis Powell, 1931
- Coluzea spiralis (A. Adams, 1856)
- Coluzea subcontracta (G. B. Sowerby III, 1902)
- †Coluzea tenuistriata Belliard, Gain & Le Renard, 2017
- Coluzea wormaldi Powell, 1971

Synonyms

- Coluzea cavelieri Gain & Le Renard, 2017 †: synonym of Denticulofusus cavelieri (Gain & Le Renard, 2017) † (original combination)
- Coluzea dissimilis (Deshayes, 1864) †: synonym of Falsifusus dissimilis (Deshayes, 1864) † (superseded combination)
- Coluzea espinosa H. J. Finlay, 1930 †: synonym of Coluzea spiralis (A. Adams, 1856) (junior subjective synonym)
- Coluzea formosissimum (Tomlin, 1928): synonym of Columbarium formosissimum Tomlin, 1928
- Coluzea gothica (Deshayes, 1834) †: synonym of Denticulofusus gothicus (Deshayes, 1834) † (superseded combination)
- Coluzea monicae Belliard, Gain & Le Renard, 2017 †: synonym of Denticulofusus monicae (Belliard, Gain & Le Renard, 2017) † (original combination)
- Coluzea pinicola Darragh, 1987: synonym of Fustifusus pinicola (Darragh, 1987)
- Coluzea unicarinata (Deshayes, 1834) †: synonym of Falsifusus unicarinatus (Deshayes, 1834) † (superseded combination)
