= C. madagascariensis =

C. madagascariensis may refer to:

- Calicalicus madagascariensis, the red-tailed vanga, a bird species endemic to Madagascar
- Caprimulgus madagascariensis, the Madagascar nightjar, a bird species found in Comoros, Madagascar, Mayotte and Seychelles
- Capurodendron madagascariensis, a plant species in the genus Capurodendron and the family Sapotaceae
- Cassis madagascariensis, a sea snail species found in the tropical Western Atlantic
- Cathariostachys madagascariensis, a bamboo species found in Madagascar
- Ceyx madagascariensis, the Madagascar pygmy-kingfisher, a bird species endemic to Madagascar
- Chalarodon madagascariensis, a lizard species found in Madagascar
- Chrysotus madagascariensis, a fly species in the genus Chrysotus
- Coniogramme madagascariensis, a fern species
- Conus madagascariensis, a sea snail species
- Cordyla madagascariensis, a plant species found only in Madagascar
- Crematogaster madagascariensis, an ant species in the genus Crematogaster
- Ctenolimnophila madagascariensis, a crane fly species in the genus Ctenolimnophila

== Synonyms ==
- Carissa madagascariensis, a synonym for Carissa spinarum, the conkerberry or bush plum, a shrub species distributed in tropical regions around the Indian Ocean
- Chrysiridia madagascariensis, a synonym for Chrysiridia rhipheus, the Madagascan sunset moth, a day-flying moth species endemic to Madagascar

== See also ==
- Coluzea madagascarensis, a sea snail species
