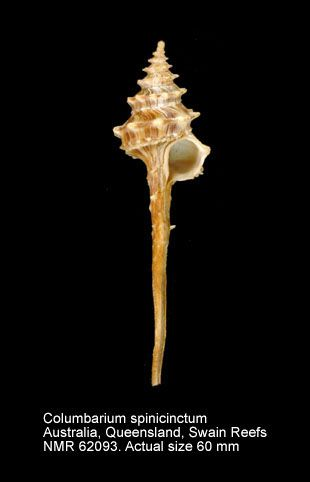

Scientific classification
- Kingdom: Animalia
- Phylum: Mollusca
- Class: Gastropoda
- Subclass: Caenogastropoda
- Order: Neogastropoda
- Family: Columbariidae
- Genus: Columbarium
- Species: C. spinicinctum

Binomial name
- Columbarium spinicinctum (Martens, 1881)

Synonyms
- Pleurotoma (Columbarium) spinicinctum Martens, 1881

= Columbarium spinicinctum =

Species of gastropod

Columbarium spinicinctum is a species of large sea snail, marine gastropod mollusk in the family Columbariidae.
