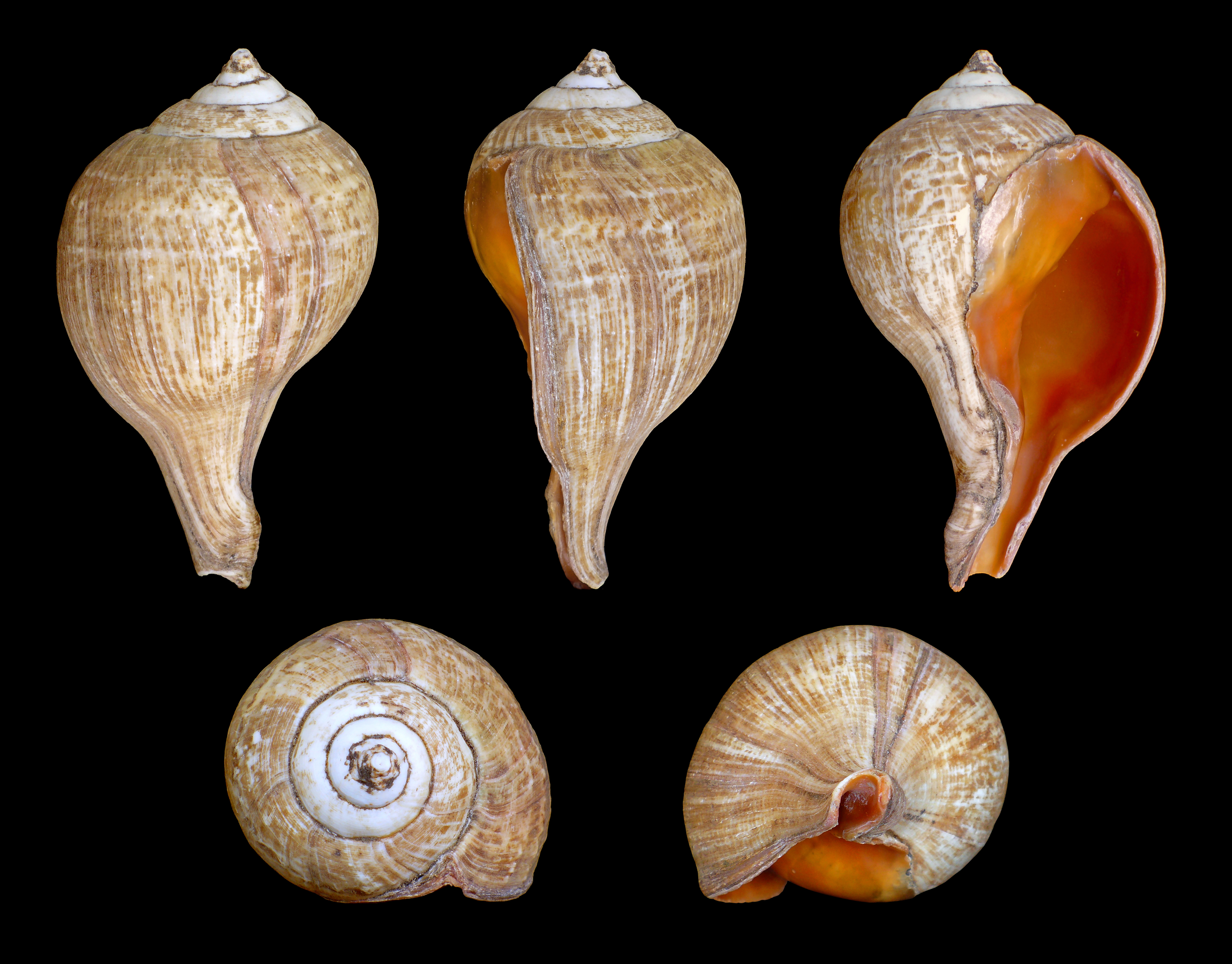
- Turbinella pyrum

Scientific classification
- Kingdom: Animalia
- Phylum: Mollusca
- Class: Gastropoda
- Subclass: Caenogastropoda
- Order: Neogastropoda
- Superfamily: Turbinelloidea; Rafinesque, 1815

= Turbinelloidea =

Superfamily of gastropods

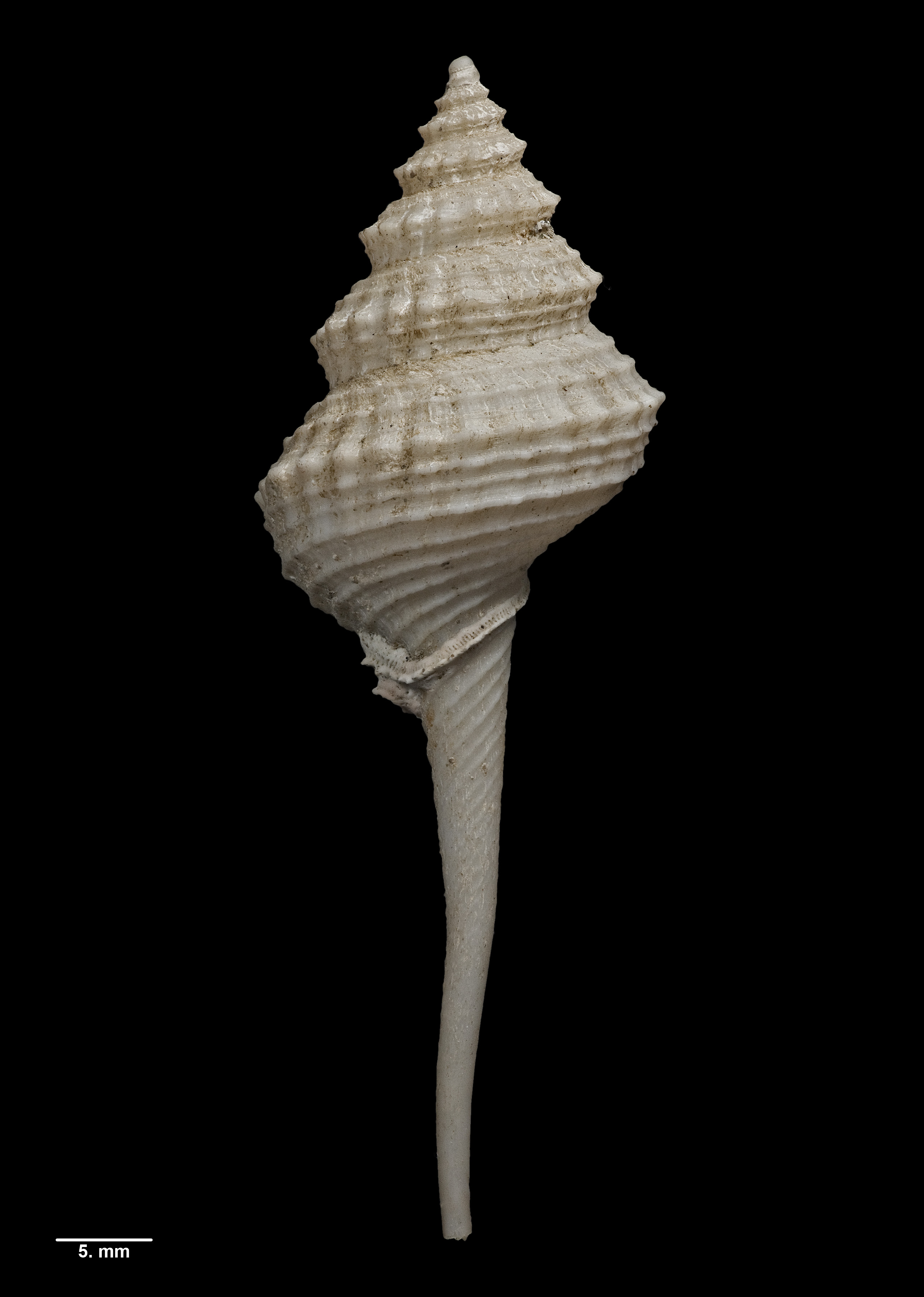
Coluzea mariae

Turbinelloidea is a superfamily of sea snails in the order Neogastropoda. It comprises the following families:

- Columbariidae Tomlin, 1928
- Costellariidae MacDonald, 1860
- Ptychatractidae Stimpson, 1865
- Turbinellidae Swainson, 1835
- Vasidae H. Adams & A. Adams, 1853
- Volutomitridae Gray, 1854

Families brought into synonymy

- Cynodontidae MacDonald, 1860: synonym of Vasinae H. Adams & A. Adams, 1853 (1840)
- Vexillidae Thiele, 1929: synonym of Costellariidae MacDonald, 1860
- Xancidae Pilsbry, 1922: synonym of Turbinellidae Swainson, 1835
