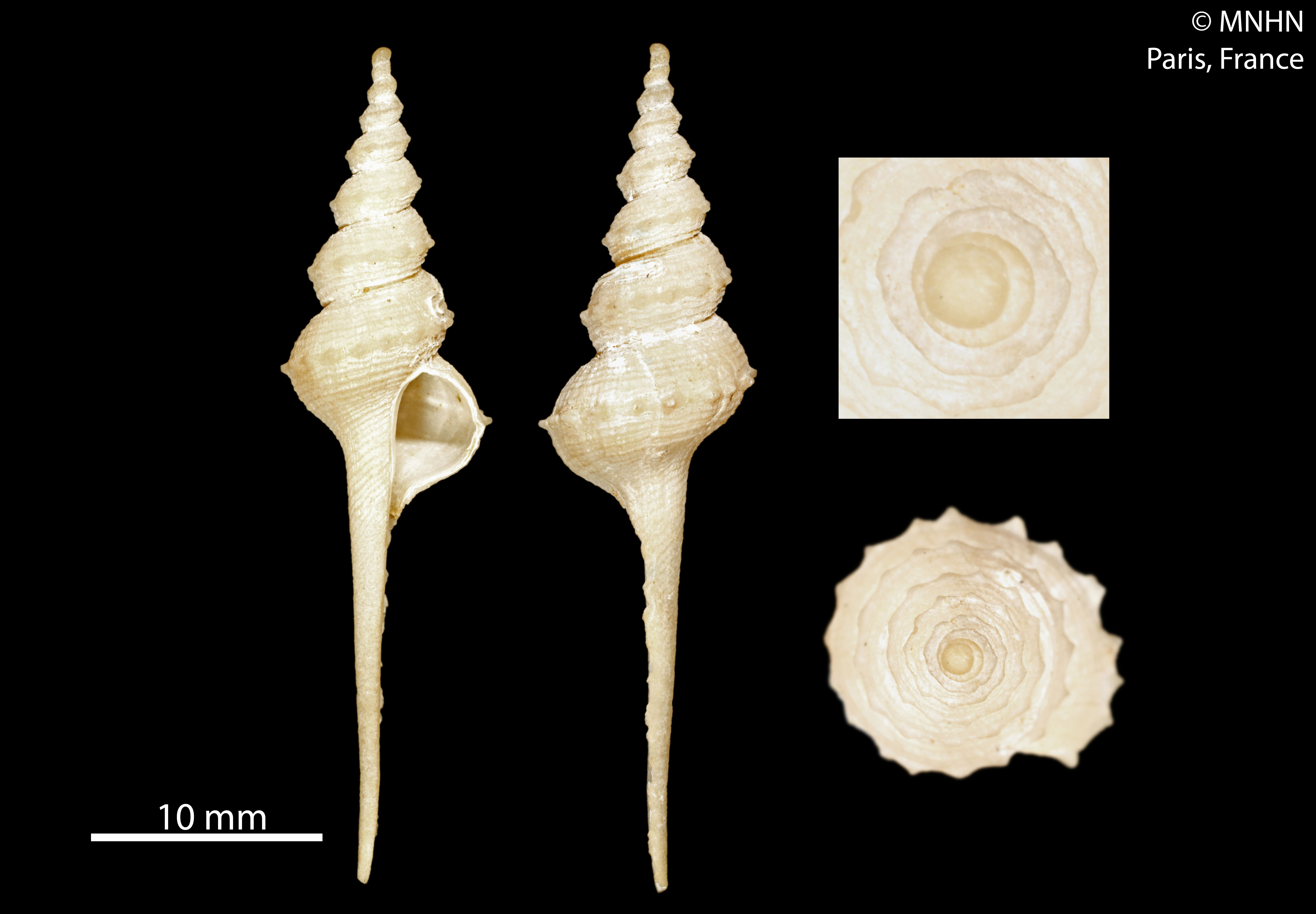
- Shell of Coluzea groschi (paratype at MNHN, Paris)

Scientific classification
- Kingdom: Animalia
- Phylum: Mollusca
- Class: Gastropoda
- Subclass: Caenogastropoda
- Order: Neogastropoda
- Family: Columbariidae
- Genus: Coluzea
- Species: C. groschi

Binomial name
- Coluzea groschi Harasewych & Fraussen, 2001

= Coluzea groschi =

Species of gastropod

Coluzea groschi is a species of large sea snail, marine gastropod mollusk in the family Columbariidae.
