= Coluzea kallistropha =

Scientific classification
- Kingdom: Animalia
- Phylum: Mollusca
- Class: Gastropoda
- Subclass: Caenogastropoda
- Order: Neogastropoda
- Family: Columbariidae
- Genus: Coluzea
- Species: C. kallistropha

Binomial name
- Coluzea kallistropha Harasewych, 2004

Species of gastropod

Coluzea kallistropha is a species of large sea snail, marine gastropod mollusk in the family Columbariidae.
