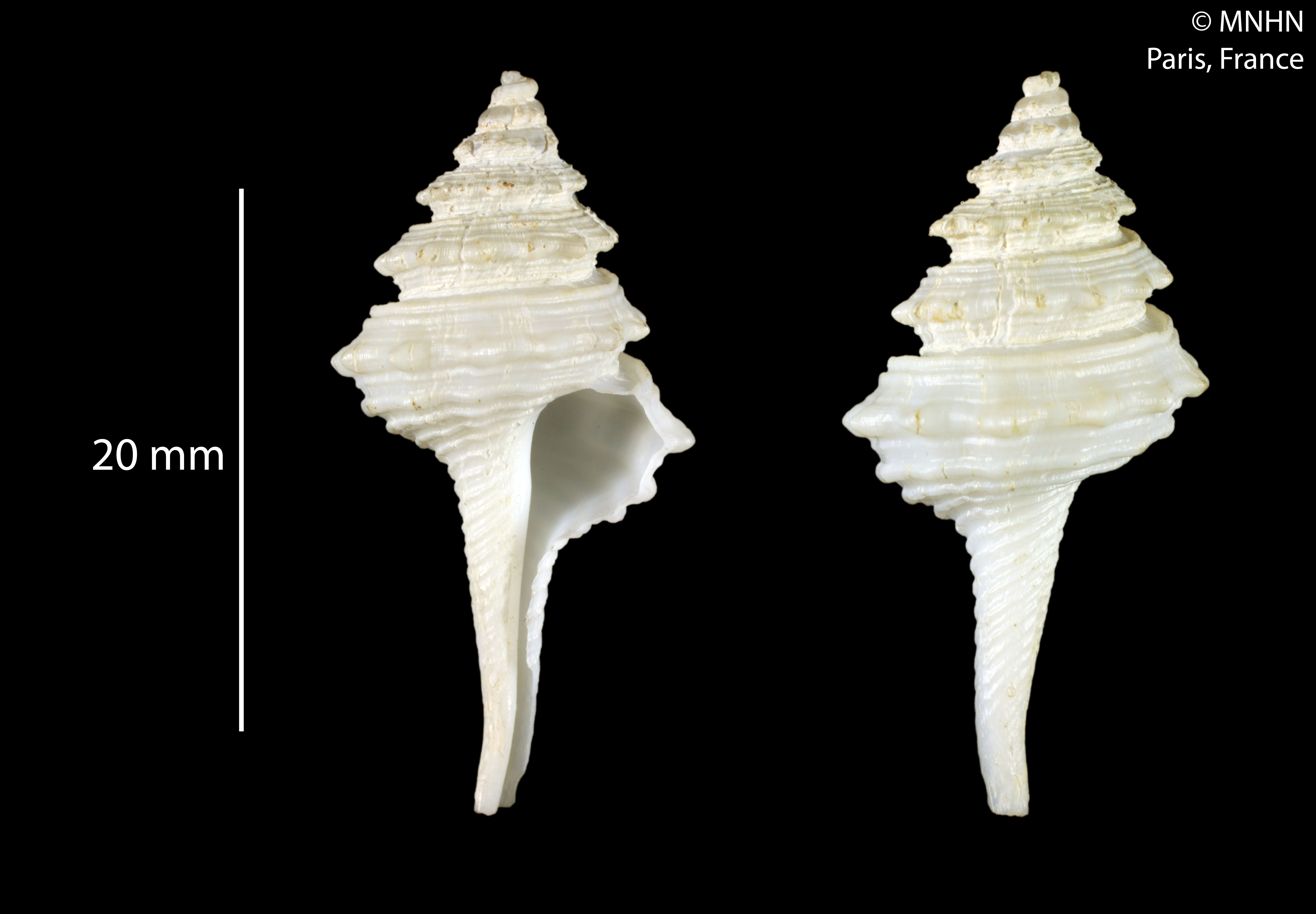
- Shell of Coluzea liriope (paratype at MNHN, Paris)

Scientific classification
- Kingdom: Animalia
- Phylum: Mollusca
- Class: Gastropoda
- Subclass: Caenogastropoda
- Order: Neogastropoda
- Family: Columbariidae
- Genus: Coluzea
- Species: C. liriope

Binomial name
- Coluzea liriope Harasewych, 1986

= Coluzea liriope =

Species of gastropod

Coluzea liriope is a species of large sea snail, marine gastropod mollusk in the family Columbariidae.

== Distribution ==
This marine species occurs off Kalimantan, Indonesia.
