= Columbarium hystriculum =

Scientific classification
- Kingdom: Animalia
- Phylum: Mollusca
- Class: Gastropoda
- Subclass: Caenogastropoda
- Order: Neogastropoda
- Family: Columbariidae
- Genus: Columbarium
- Species: C. hystriculum

Binomial name
- Columbarium hystriculum Darragh, 1987

Species of gastropod

Columbarium hystriculum is a species of large sea snail, a marine gastropod mollusk in the family Columbariidae.
