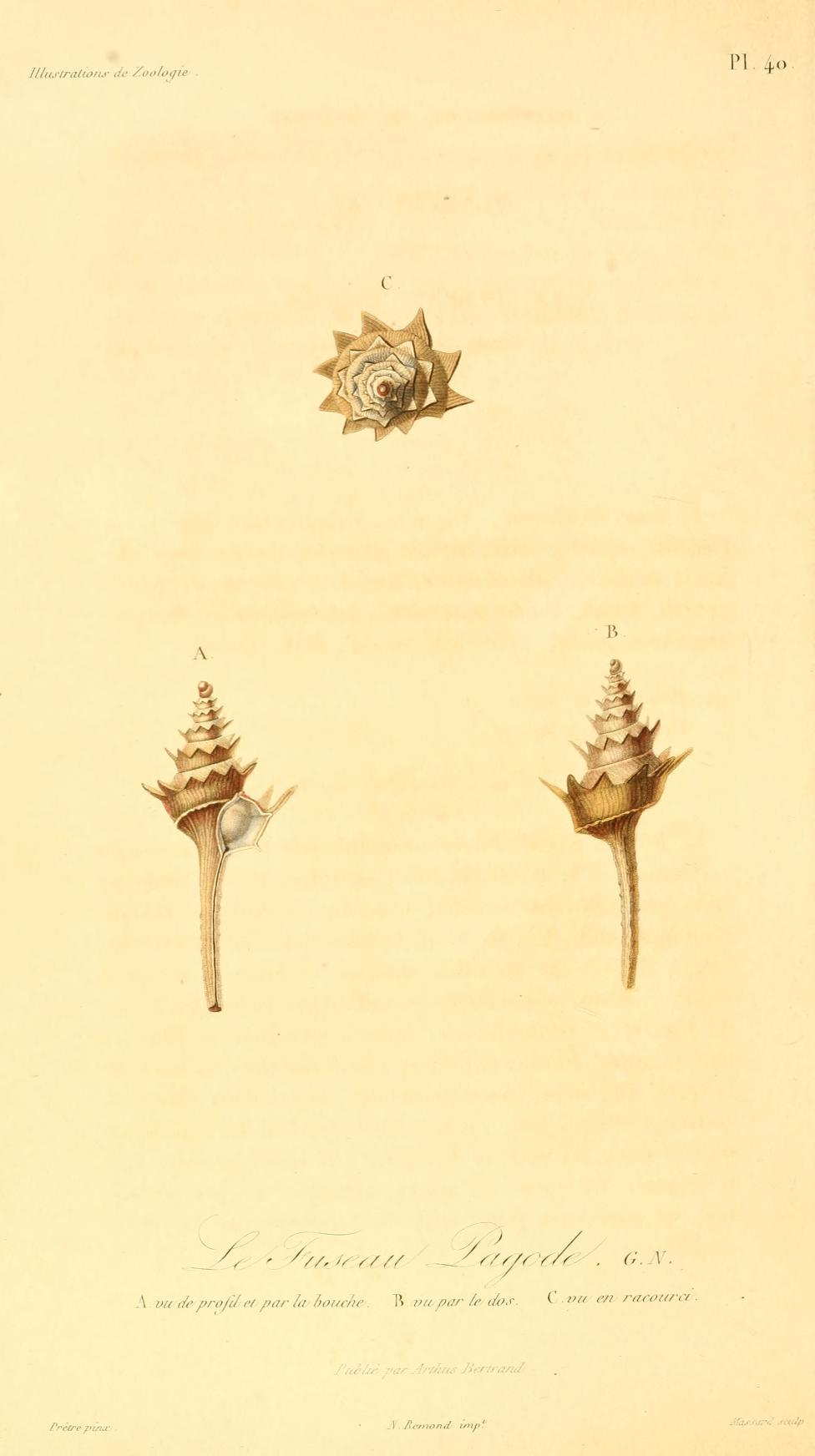

Scientific classification
- Kingdom: Animalia
- Phylum: Mollusca
- Class: Gastropoda
- Subclass: Caenogastropoda
- Order: Neogastropoda
- Family: Columbariidae
- Genus: Columbarium
- Species: C. pagoda

Binomial name
- Columbarium pagoda (Lesson, 1831)

Synonyms
- Columbarium pagoda costatum Shikama, 1963; Columbarium pagoda stellatum Habe, 1953; Fusus diadema G.B. Sowerby II, 1880; Fusus japonicus Gray, 1839

= Columbarium pagoda =

Species of gastropod

Columbarium pagoda is a species of large sea snail, marine gastropod mollusk in the family Columbariidae.
