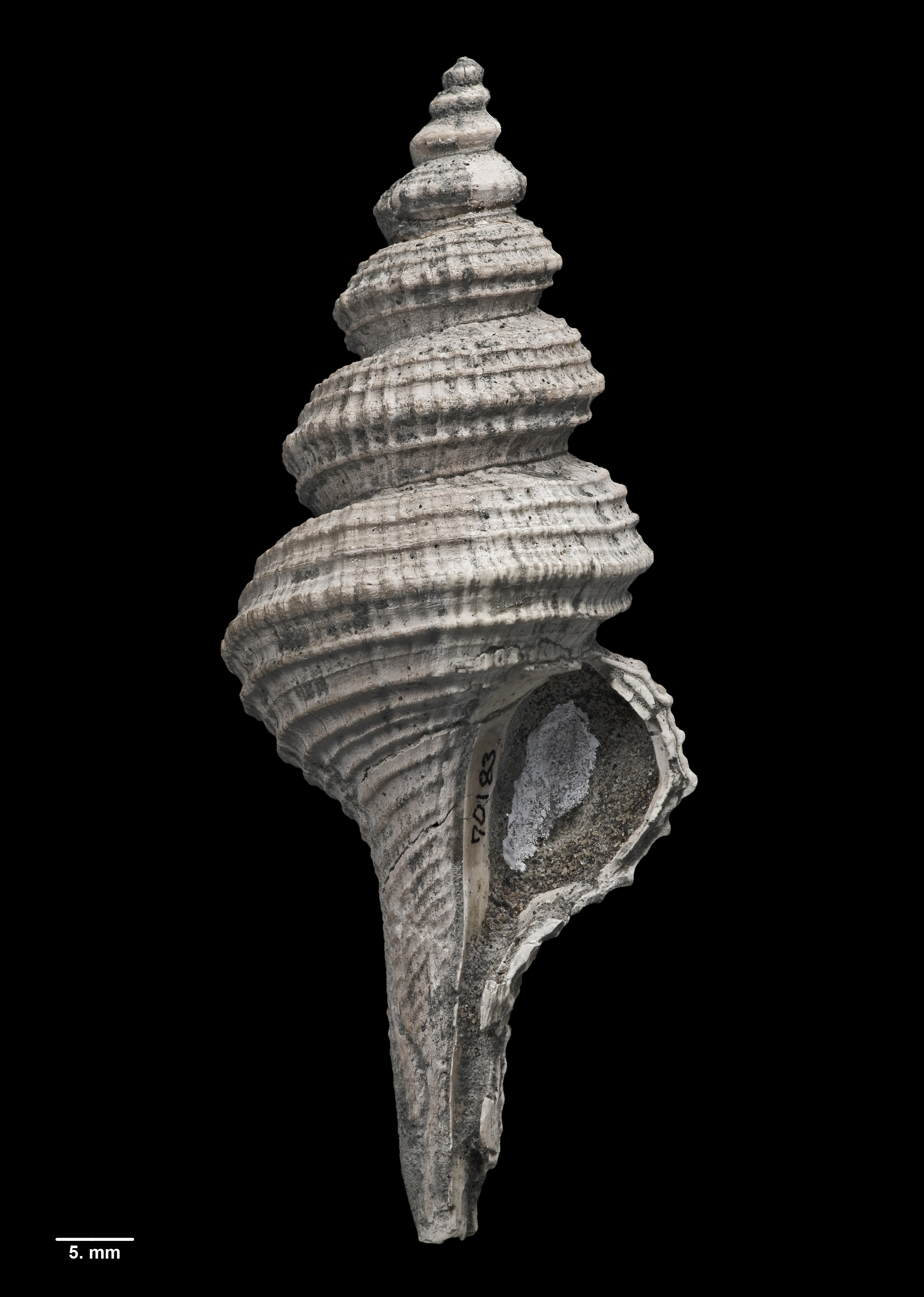
- Holotype from Auckland War Memorial Museum

Scientific classification
- Kingdom: Animalia
- Phylum: Mollusca
- Class: Gastropoda
- Subclass: Caenogastropoda
- Order: Neogastropoda
- Family: Columbariidae
- Genus: Coluzea
- Species: C. spectabilis

Binomial name
- Coluzea spectabilis A. W. B. Powell, 1931

= Coluzea spectabilis =

Coluzea spectabilis Temporal range: 3.70 Ma

Extinct species of gastropod

Coluzea spectabilis is an extinct species of sea snail, a marine gastropod mollusc in the family Columbariidae. Fossils of the species date to the Waipipian stage (3.70 million years ago) of the late Pliocene in New Zealand, and have been found at Waihi Beach near Hāwera, South Taranaki, and in the Carterton District.

== Description ==
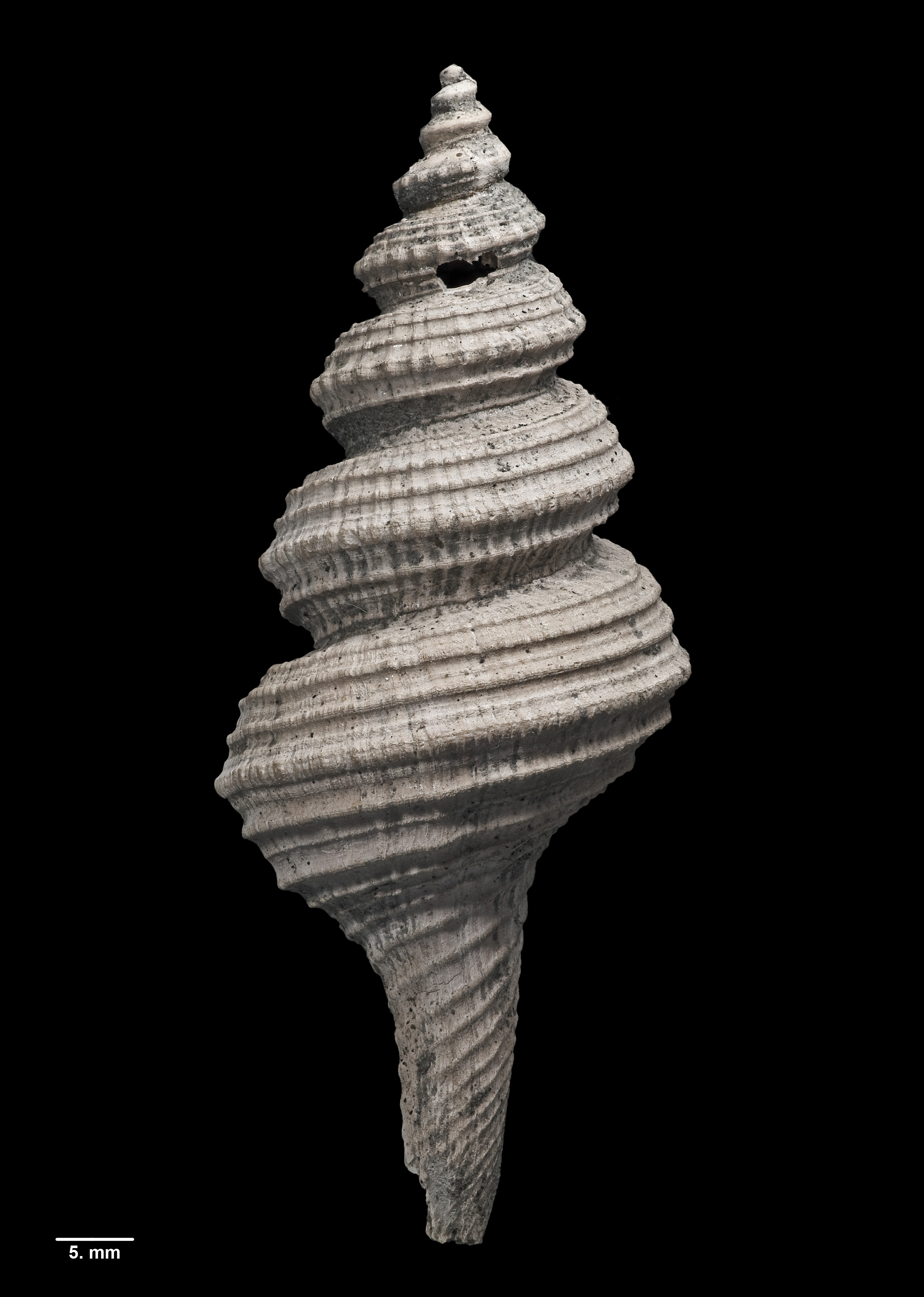
Side view of holotype

In the original description, Powell described the species as follows:

Shell very large for the genus. Spire tall, about three-fourths height of aperture plus canal (estimated from decollated paratype with complete canal). Whorls about ten, strongly convex and much indented at sutures. Sculpture consisting of prominent spiral carinae crossed by numerous regularly spaced axial growth folds, which render the carinae slightly nodulous at points of intersection. There are about fifty peripheral nodules on the penultimate whorl. On the upper spire-whorls there are three strong carinae above the periphery, then a moderately flat shoulder overhung by the preceding whorl, and below a single strong carina between the periphery and suture. In the holotype there is a weak thread in each intercarinal space. On the base and canal there are fifteen carinae, which gradually become weaker and more closely spaced, finally fading out at about half way down the canal.

The holotype of the species has an estimated height of 90.0 mm (3.54 in) and a diameter of 30 mm (1.2 in). It can be identified due to its more numerous peripheral spines (weak and closely spaced), and by its carina having only slight nodulation.

== Taxonomy ==
The species was first described by A. W. B. Powell in 1931. The holotype was collected in January 1931 by Powell from near the mouth of Waihi Stream, Hāwera, South Taranaki. It is held in the collections of Auckland War Memorial Museum.

== Distribution ==
This extinct marine species occurs in late Pliocene Waipipian stage fossils in New Zealand, including the Tangahoe Formation. Fossils have been found in South Taranaki near Hāwera, and in the Wairarapa near Carrington, Carterton District.
