= Columbarium corollaceoum =

Scientific classification
- Kingdom: Animalia
- Phylum: Mollusca
- Class: Gastropoda
- Subclass: Caenogastropoda
- Order: Neogastropoda
- Family: Columbariidae
- Genus: Columbarium
- Species: C. corollaceoum

Binomial name
- Columbarium corollaceoum Zhang, 2003

Species of gastropod

Columbarium corollaceoum is a species of large sea snail, a marine gastropod mollusc in the family Columbariidae.
