= Fulgurofusus ecphoroides =

Scientific classification
- Kingdom: Animalia
- Phylum: Mollusca
- Class: Gastropoda
- Subclass: Caenogastropoda
- Order: Neogastropoda
- Family: Columbariidae
- Genus: Fulgurofusus
- Species: F. ecphoroides

Binomial name
- Fulgurofusus ecphoroides Harasewych, 1983

Species of gastropod

Fulgurofusus ecphoroides is a species of large sea snail, marine gastropod mollusk in the family Turbinellidae.
