= Fulgurofusus sarissophorus =

Scientific classification
- Kingdom: Animalia
- Phylum: Mollusca
- Class: Gastropoda
- Subclass: Caenogastropoda
- Order: Neogastropoda
- Family: Columbariidae
- Genus: Fulgurofusus
- Species: F. sarissophorus

Binomial name
- Fulgurofusus sarissophorus (Watson, 1882)

Synonyms
- Fusus sarissophorus Watson, 1882

Species of gastropod

Fulgurofusus sarissophorus is a species of large sea snail, marine gastropod mollusk in the family Turbinellidae.
