= Columbarium sinense =

Scientific classification
- Kingdom: Animalia
- Phylum: Mollusca
- Class: Gastropoda
- Subclass: Caenogastropoda
- Order: Neogastropoda
- Family: Columbariidae
- Genus: Columbarium
- Species: C. sinense

Binomial name
- Columbarium sinense Zhang, 2003

Synonyms
- Columbarium sinensis [sic] (wrong gender agreement of specific epithet)

Species of gastropod

Columbarium sinense is a species of large sea snail, marine gastropod mollusc in the family Columbariidae.

== Distribution ==
This marine species was found off Hainan, China.
