= Fulgurofusus nanshaensis =

Scientific classification
- Kingdom: Animalia
- Phylum: Mollusca
- Class: Gastropoda
- Subclass: Caenogastropoda
- Order: Neogastropoda
- Family: Columbariidae
- Genus: Fulgurofusus
- Species: F. nanshaensis

Binomial name
- Fulgurofusus nanshaensis Zhang, 2003

Species of mollusc

Fulgurofusus nanshaensis is a species of large sea snail, marine gastropod mollusk in the family Turbinellidae.

== Distribution ==
Fulgurofusus nanshaensis was first located in the South China Sea.
