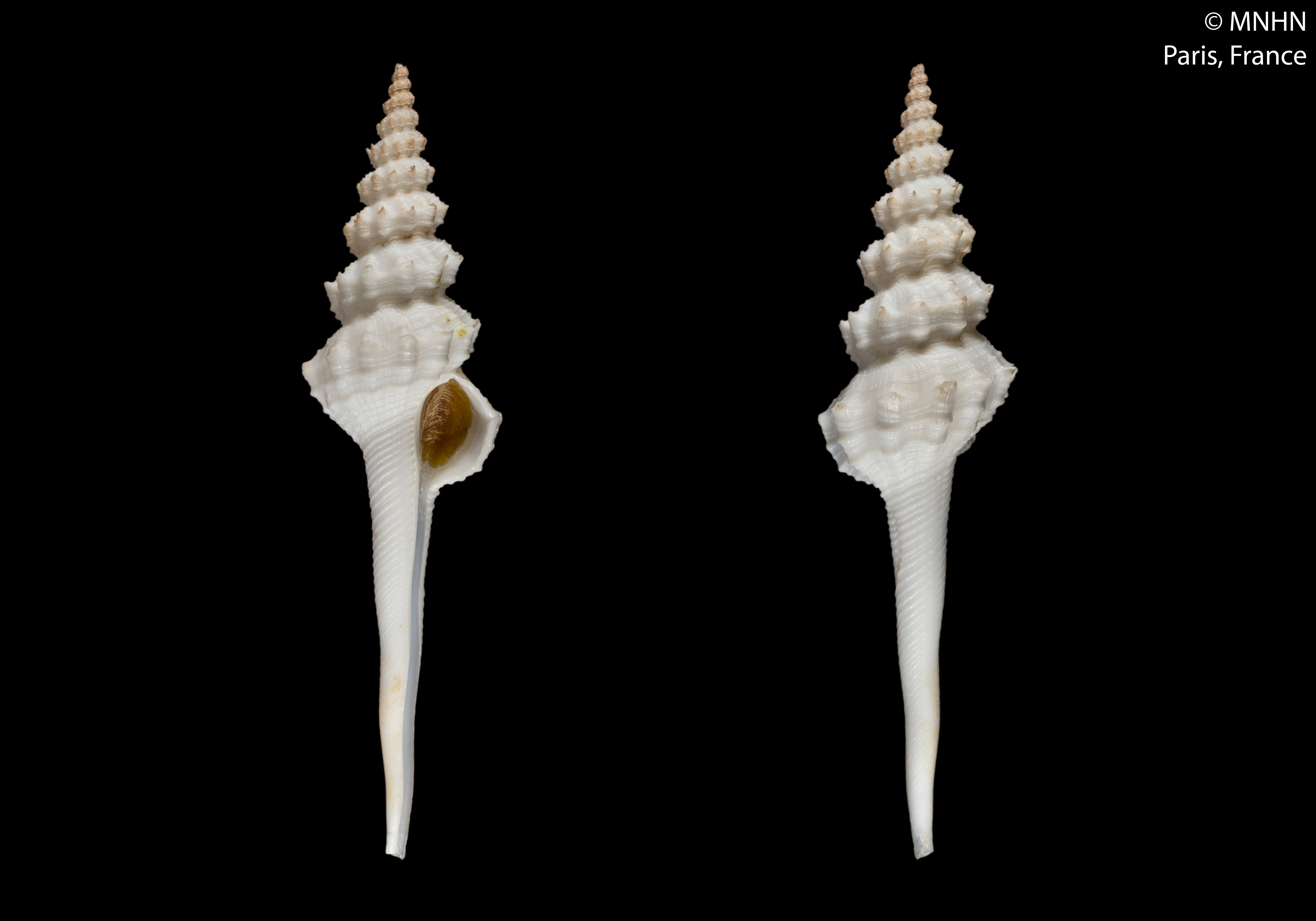

Scientific classification
- Kingdom: Animalia
- Phylum: Mollusca
- Class: Gastropoda
- Subclass: Caenogastropoda
- Order: Neogastropoda
- Family: Columbariidae
- Genus: Coluzea
- Species: C. faceta

Binomial name
- Coluzea faceta Harasewych, 1991

= Coluzea faceta =

Species of gastropod

Coluzea faceta is a species of large sea snail, marine gastropod mollusk in the family Columbariidae.
