= Columbarium natalense =

Scientific classification
- Kingdom: Animalia
- Phylum: Mollusca
- Class: Gastropoda
- Subclass: Caenogastropoda
- Order: Neogastropoda
- Family: Columbariidae
- Genus: Columbarium
- Species: C. natalense

Binomial name
- Columbarium natalense Tomlin, 1928

Species of gastropod

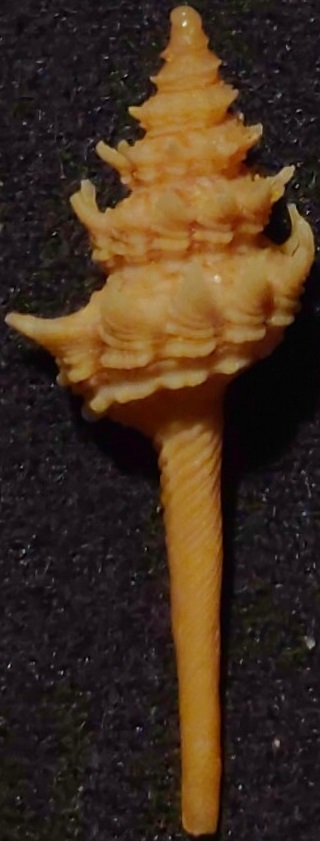

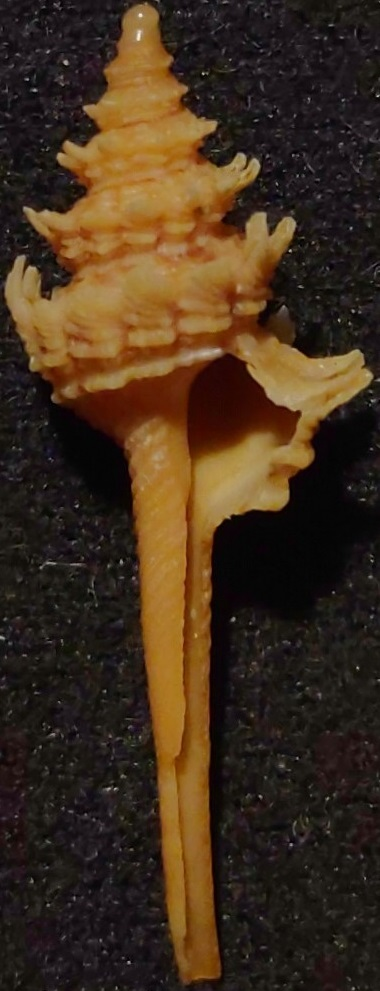

Columbarium natalense is a species of large sea snail, marine gastropod mollusk in the family Columbariidae.
