= Columbarium harrisae =

Scientific classification
- Kingdom: Animalia
- Phylum: Mollusca
- Class: Gastropoda
- Subclass: Caenogastropoda
- Order: Neogastropoda
- Family: Columbariidae
- Genus: Columbarium
- Species: C. harrisae

Binomial name
- Columbarium harrisae Harasewych, 1983

Species of gastropod

Columbarium harrisae is a species of large sea snail, marine gastropod mollusk in the family Columbariidae.

== Distribution ==
Northeast Australia, Queensland
