= Columbarium hedleyi =

Scientific classification
- Kingdom: Animalia
- Phylum: Mollusca
- Class: Gastropoda
- Subclass: Caenogastropoda
- Order: Neogastropoda
- Family: Columbariidae
- Genus: Columbarium
- Species: C. hedleyi

Binomial name
- Columbarium hedleyi Iredale, 1936

Synonyms
- Columbarium trabeatum Iredale, 1936

Species of gastropod

Columbarium hedleyi is a species of large sea snail, marine gastropod mollusk in the family Columbariidae.
