= Columbarium veridicum =

Scientific classification
- Kingdom: Animalia
- Phylum: Mollusca
- Class: Gastropoda
- Subclass: Caenogastropoda
- Order: Neogastropoda
- Family: Columbariidae
- Genus: Columbarium
- Species: C. veridicum

Binomial name
- Columbarium veridicum Dell, 1963

Species of gastropod

Columbarium veridicum is a species of deepwater sea snail, a marine gastropod mollusc in the family Columbariidae.

== Distribution ==
This species occurs off of New Zealand.
