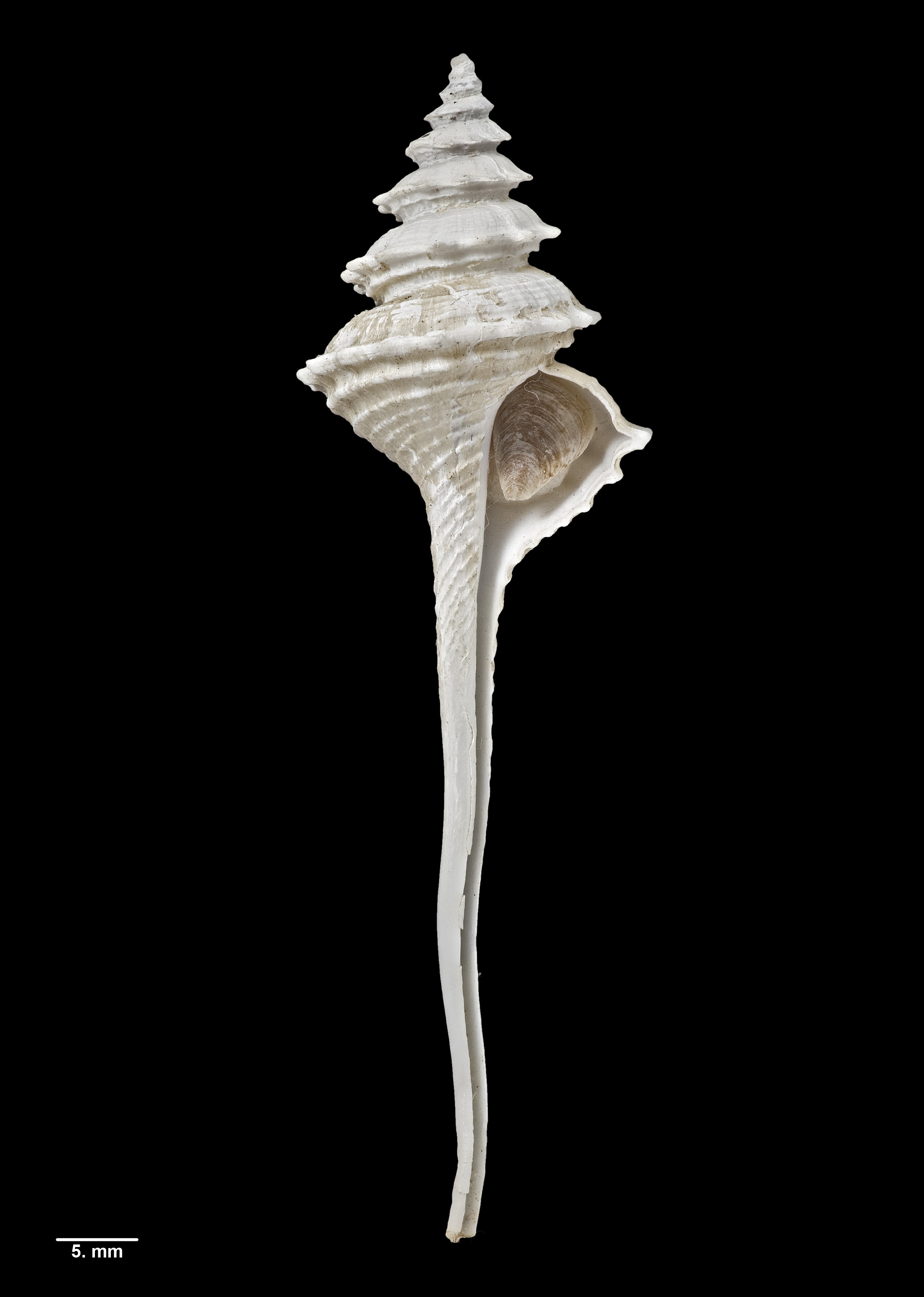
- Holotype of Coluzea wormaldi from the collections of Auckland War Memorial Museum

Scientific classification
- Kingdom: Animalia
- Phylum: Mollusca
- Class: Gastropoda
- Subclass: Caenogastropoda
- Order: Neogastropoda
- Family: Columbariidae
- Genus: Coluzea
- Species: C. wormaldi

Binomial name
- Coluzea wormaldi Powell, 1971

= Coluzea wormaldi =

Species of gastropod

Coluzea wormaldi is a species of large sea snail, marine gastropod mollusk in the family Columbariidae.

== Description ==
The length of the shell varies between 44 mm and 105 mm, its diameter between 16mm and 28.7 mm.

(Original description) While this species shares the broadly conical, short spire characteristic of Coluzea mariae (Powell, 1952), its whorls are shallower and more vertically compressed. It is further distinguished by a more prominently flanged peripheral keel that bears fewer, yet more spinose, tubercles. In terms of sculptural style, however, the broad, low spire and vertically compressed whorls are its only real similarities to Coluzea mariae; in all other decorative aspects, it resembles Columbarium spiralis (A. Adams, 1856).

The shell itself is moderately large, featuring a broad, vertically compressed spire and a long, nearly straight siphonal canal that accounts for roughly two-thirds of the total shell height. The whorls are defined by a flat, smooth area just below the suture, followed by a broader, convex region adorned with four weak, smooth spiral cords that run down to the periphery. Situated below the mid-whorl height, this periphery forms a sharply projecting flange sculptured with twelve to fourteen regular, broad-based, and pointed spines per whorl.

Between the peripheral keel and the lower suture lies a minor, undulating to subnodose keel. On the base of the shell, five or six narrow but strong spiral cords extend downward, gradually diminishing in strength over more than half the length of the siphonal canal, while the remainder of the siphonal canal is smooth. In life, the white shell is covered by a pale olive periostracum, and its operculum is wedge-shaped.

== Distribution ==
This marine species occurs off North Island, New Zealand.
