= Fulgurofusus electra =

Scientific classification
- Kingdom: Animalia
- Phylum: Mollusca
- Class: Gastropoda
- Subclass: Caenogastropoda
- Order: Neogastropoda
- Family: Columbariidae
- Genus: Fulgurofusus
- Species: F. electra

Binomial name
- Fulgurofusus electra (F. M. Bayer, 1971)

Species of gastropod

Previously referred to as Columbarium electra, Fulgurofusus electra is a species of large sea snail, marine gastropod mollusk in the family Turbinellidae.

== Distribution ==
First documented in the Straights of Florida, Fulgurofusus electra is found in the waters of the Gulf of Mexico.
