= Columbarium pagodoides =

Scientific classification
- Kingdom: Animalia
- Phylum: Mollusca
- Class: Gastropoda
- Subclass: Caenogastropoda
- Order: Neogastropoda
- Family: Columbariidae
- Genus: Columbarium
- Species: C. pagodoides

Binomial name
- Columbarium pagodoides (Watson, 1882)

Synonyms
- Fusus (Colus) pagodoides Watson, 1882

Species of gastropod

Columbarium pagodoides is a species of large sea snail, marine gastropod mollusk in the family Columbariidae.
