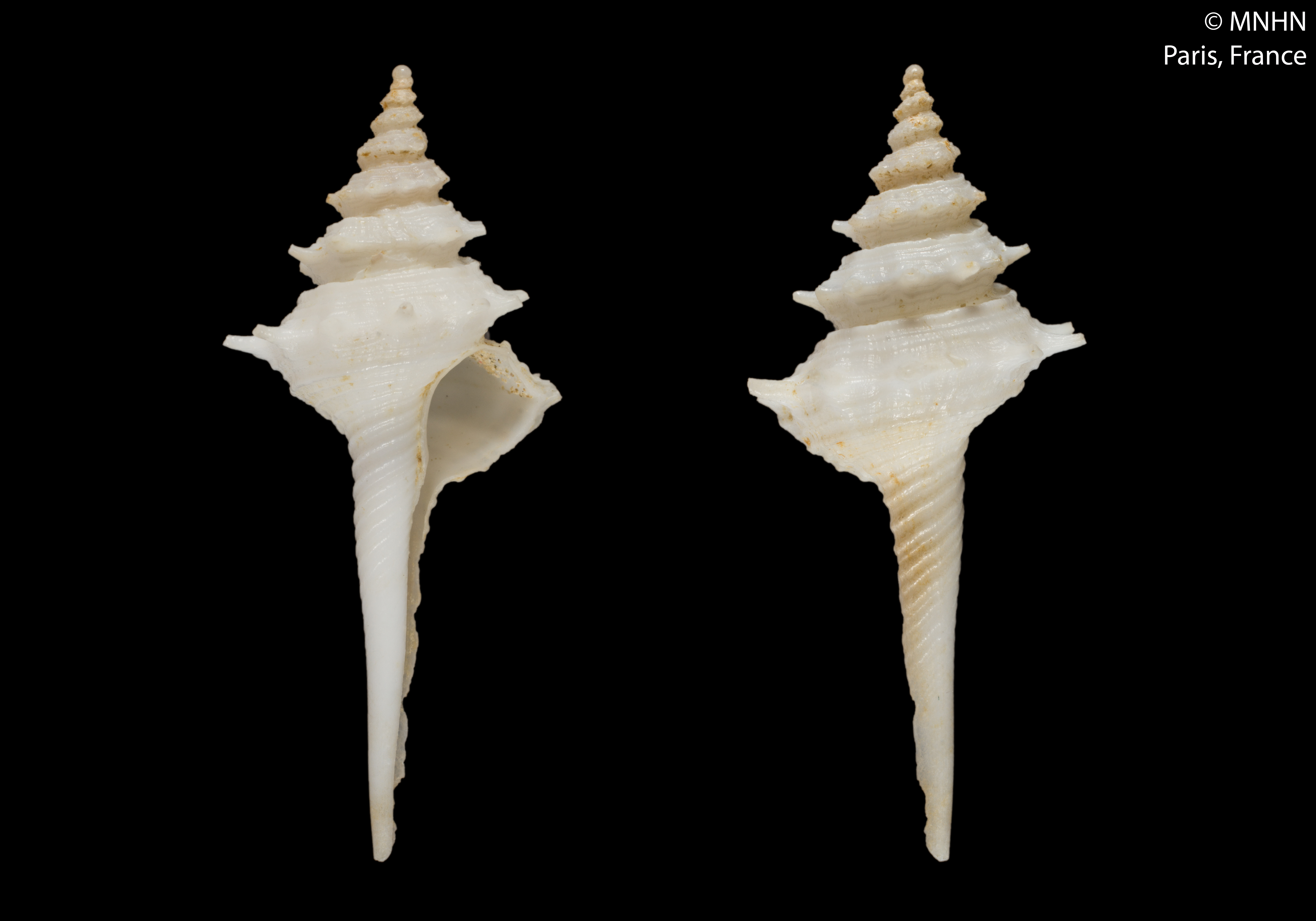
- Shell of Coluzea rosadoi (holotype at MNHN, Paris)

Scientific classification
- Kingdom: Animalia
- Phylum: Mollusca
- Class: Gastropoda
- Subclass: Caenogastropoda
- Order: Neogastropoda
- Family: Columbariidae
- Genus: Coluzea
- Species: C. rosadoi

Binomial name
- Coluzea rosadoi Bozzetti, 2006

= Coluzea rosadoi =

Species of gastropod

Coluzea rosadoi is a species of large sea snail, marine gastropod mollusk in the family Columbariidae.

== Distribution ==
This marine species occurs in the Indian Ocean off Tanzania and Mozambique.
