= Histricosceptrum xenismatis =

Scientific classification
- Kingdom: Animalia
- Phylum: Mollusca
- Class: Gastropoda
- Subclass: Caenogastropoda
- Order: Neogastropoda
- Family: Columbariidae
- Genus: Histricosceptrum
- Species: H. xenismatis

Binomial name
- Histricosceptrum xenismatis (Harasewych, 1983)

Synonyms
- Fulgurofusus xenismatis Harasewych, 1983

Species of gastropod

Histricosceptrum xenismatis is a species of large sea snail, marine gastropod mollusk in the family Turbinellidae.
