= Fulgurofusus merope =

Scientific classification
- Kingdom: Animalia
- Phylum: Mollusca
- Class: Gastropoda
- Subclass: Caenogastropoda
- Order: Neogastropoda
- Family: Columbariidae
- Genus: Fulgurofusus
- Species: F. merope

Binomial name
- Fulgurofusus merope (F. M. Bayer, 1971)

Species of gastropod

Fulgurofusus merope is a species of large sea snail, marine gastropod mollusk in the family Turbinellidae.
