= Columbarium suzukii =

Scientific classification
- Kingdom: Animalia
- Phylum: Mollusca
- Class: Gastropoda
- Subclass: Caenogastropoda
- Order: Neogastropoda
- Family: Columbariidae
- Genus: Columbarium
- Species: C. suzukii

Binomial name
- Columbarium suzukii Habe & Kosuge, 1972

Species of gastropod

Columbarium suzukii is a species of large sea snail, marine gastropod mollusk in the family Columbariidae.
