= Fulgurofusus tomicici =

Scientific classification
- Kingdom: Animalia
- Phylum: Mollusca
- Class: Gastropoda
- Subclass: Caenogastropoda
- Order: Neogastropoda
- Family: Columbariidae
- Genus: Fulgurofusus
- Species: F. tomicici

Binomial name
- Fulgurofusus tomicici McLean & Andrade, 1982

Species of gastropod

Fulgurofusus tomicici is a species of large sea snail, marine gastropod mollusk in the family Turbinellidae.
