= Columbarium quadrativaricosum =

Scientific classification
- Kingdom: Animalia
- Phylum: Mollusca
- Class: Gastropoda
- Subclass: Caenogastropoda
- Order: Neogastropoda
- Family: Columbariidae
- Genus: Columbarium
- Species: C. quadrativaricosum

Binomial name
- Columbarium quadrativaricosum Harasewych, 2004

Synonyms
- Columbrarium quadrativaricosum Harasewych, 2004

Species of gastropod

Columbarium quadrativaricosum is a species of large sea snail, marine gastropod mollusk in the family Columbariidae.
