= Fulgurofusus atlantis =

Scientific classification
- Kingdom: Animalia
- Phylum: Mollusca
- Class: Gastropoda
- Subclass: Caenogastropoda
- Order: Neogastropoda
- Family: Columbariidae
- Genus: Fulgurofusus
- Species: F. atlantis

Binomial name
- Fulgurofusus atlantis (Clench & Aguayo, 1938)

Species of gastropod

Fulgurofusus atlantis is a species of large sea snail, marine gastropod mollusk in the family Turbinellidae.
