= Peristarium merope =

Scientific classification
- Kingdom: Animalia
- Phylum: Mollusca
- Class: Gastropoda
- Subclass: Caenogastropoda
- Order: Neogastropoda
- Family: Columbariidae
- Genus: Peristarium
- Species: P. merope

Binomial name
- Peristarium merope (Bayer, 1971)

Synonyms
- Columbarium merope Bayer, 1971

Species of gastropod

Peristarium merope is a species of large sea snail, marine gastropod mollusk in the family Turbinellidae.
