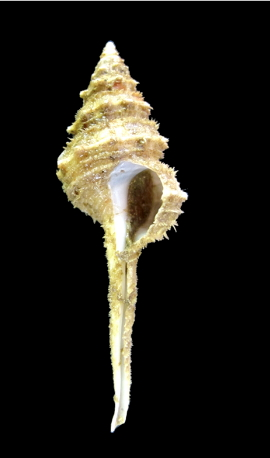
- Shell of Coluzea radialis

Scientific classification
- Kingdom: Animalia
- Phylum: Mollusca
- Class: Gastropoda
- Subclass: Caenogastropoda
- Order: Neogastropoda
- Family: Columbariidae
- Genus: Coluzea
- Species: C. radialis

Binomial name
- Coluzea radialis (Watson, 1882)

Synonyms
- Fusus (Colus) radialis Watson, 1882; Fusus radialis R. B. Watson, 1882 superseded combination

= Coluzea radialis =

Species of gastropod

Coluzea radialis, common name the Benguela pagoda shell, is a species of large sea snail, marine gastropod mollusk in the family Columbariidae.

== Description ==
The length of the shell attains 75 mm.

The white shell is relatively thin, with a long, slender, and straight siphonal canal. The periphery features a spiral row of bluntly triangular spines, ranging from 15 to 50 on the body whorl. The rest of the shell is sculpted with spiral cords, which are most prominent below the periphery and along the base of the siphonal canal. In some specimens, low axial ribs are associated with the peripheral spines.

== Distribution ==
This marine species is endemic to South Africa and occurs off the West coast, off Atlantic Cape region (Alexander Bay to Cape Point), at depths between 160 m and 420 m.
