= Histricosceptrum =

Scientific classification
- Kingdom: Animalia
- Phylum: Mollusca
- Class: Gastropoda
- Subclass: Caenogastropoda
- Order: Neogastropoda
- Family: Columbariidae
- Genus: Histricosceptrum; Darragh, 1969

Genus of gastropods

Histricosceptrum is a genus of sea snails, marine gastropod mollusks in the family Turbinellidae.

== Species ==
Species within the genus Histricosceptrum include:

- Histricosceptrum atlantis (Clench & Aguayo, 1938)
- Histricosceptrum bartletti (Clench & Aguayo, 1940)
- Histricosceptrum xenismatis (Harasewych, 1983)
