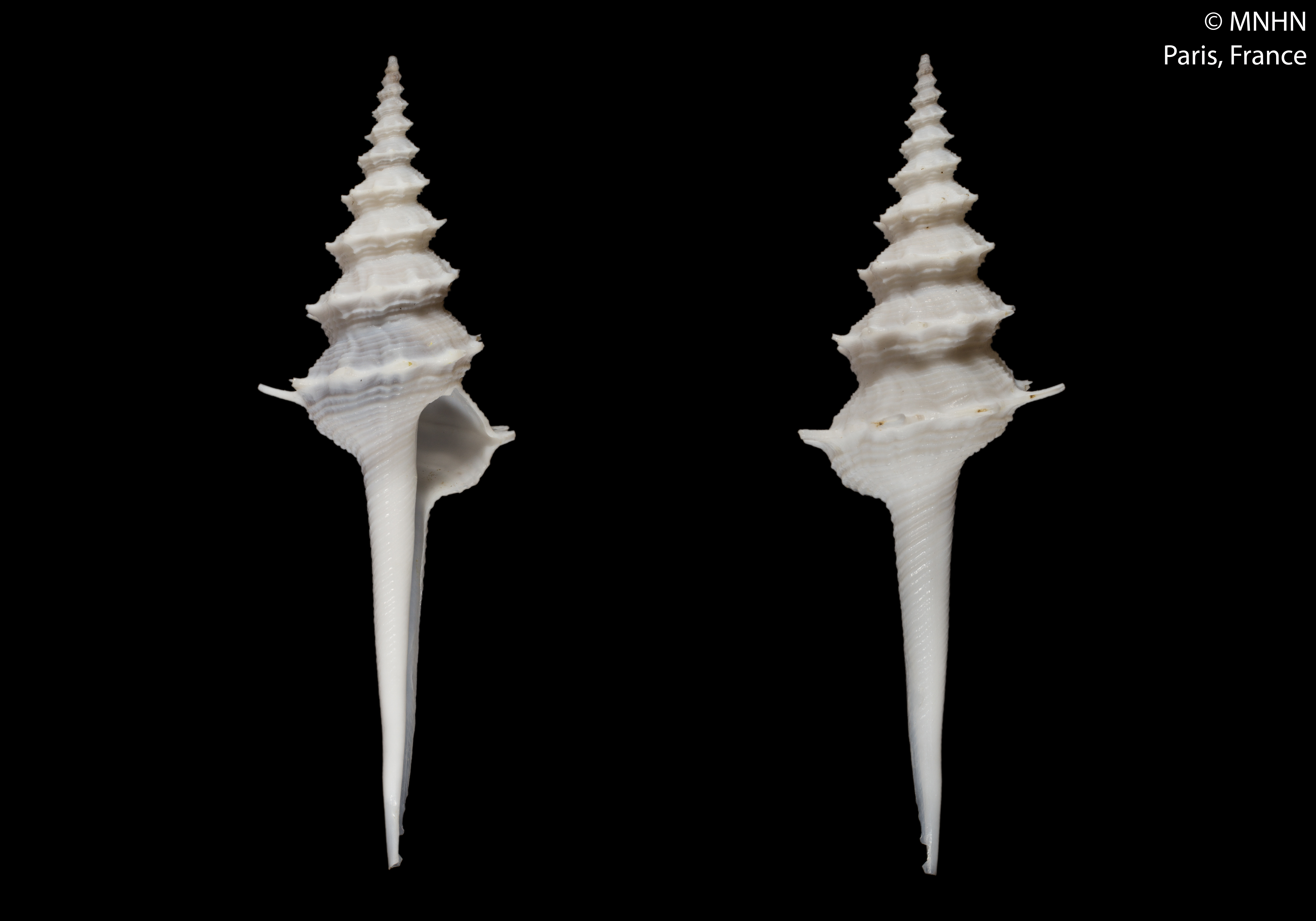
- Shell of Coluzea berthae (holotype at MNHN, Paris)

Scientific classification
- Kingdom: Animalia
- Phylum: Mollusca
- Class: Gastropoda
- Subclass: Caenogastropoda
- Order: Neogastropoda
- Family: Columbariidae
- Genus: Coluzea
- Species: C. berthae

Binomial name
- Coluzea berthae (Monsecour & Kreipl, 2003)

Synonyms
- Columbarium berthae Monsecour & Kreipl, 2003

= Coluzea berthae =

Species of gastropod

Coluzea berthae is a species of large sea snail, marine gastropod mollusc in the family Columbariidae.

== Distribution ==
This marine species occurs off Madagascar.
