= Columbarium formosissimum =

Scientific classification
- Kingdom: Animalia
- Phylum: Mollusca
- Class: Gastropoda
- Subclass: Caenogastropoda
- Order: Neogastropoda
- Family: Columbariidae
- Genus: Columbarium
- Species: C. formosissimum

Binomial name
- Columbarium formosissimum Tomlin, 1928

Species of gastropod

Columbarium formosissimum is a species of large sea snail, marine gastropod mollusk in the family Columbariidae.
