= Coluzea canaliculatum =

Scientific classification
- Kingdom: Animalia
- Phylum: Mollusca
- Class: Gastropoda
- Subclass: Caenogastropoda
- Order: Neogastropoda
- Family: Columbariidae
- Genus: Coluzea
- Species: C. canaliculatum

Binomial name
- Coluzea canaliculatum (Martens, 1901)

Synonyms
- Columbarium canaliculatum Martens, 1901

Species of gastropod

Coluzea canaliculatum is a species of large sea snail, marine gastropod mollusk in the family Columbariidae.
