= Coluzea subcontracta =

Scientific classification
- Kingdom: Animalia
- Phylum: Mollusca
- Class: Gastropoda
- Subclass: Caenogastropoda
- Order: Neogastropoda
- Family: Columbariidae
- Genus: Coluzea
- Species: C. subcontracta

Binomial name
- Coluzea subcontracta (Sowerby III, 1902)

Synonyms
- Columbarium subcontractum (G. B. Sowerby III, 1902); Fusus subcontractus G.B. Sowerby III, 1902

Species of gastropod

Coluzea subcontracta is a species of large sea snail, marine gastropod mollusk in the family Columbariidae.
