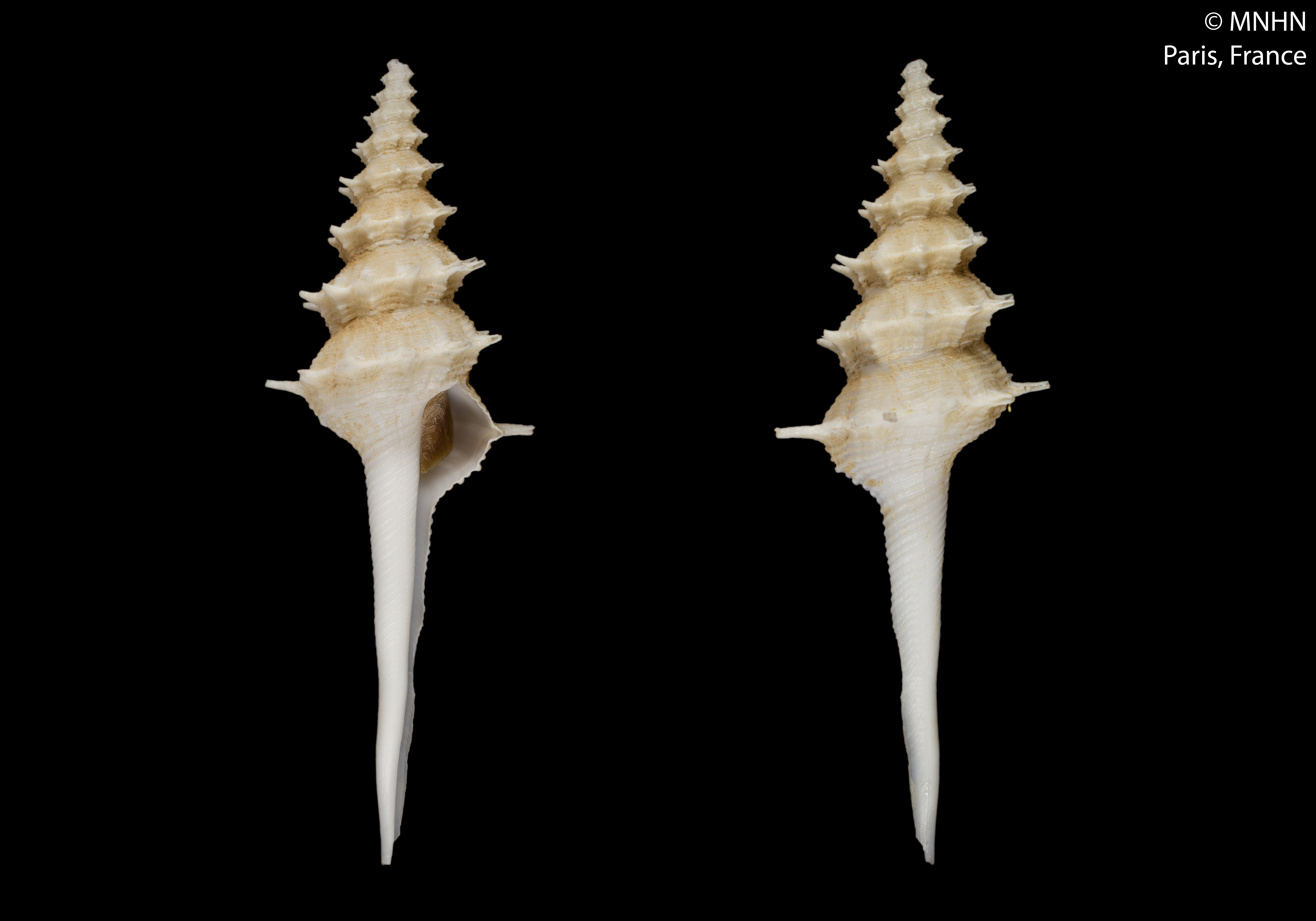
- Shell of Coluzea madagascarensis (holotype at MNHN, Paris)

Scientific classification
- Kingdom: Animalia
- Phylum: Mollusca
- Class: Gastropoda
- Subclass: Caenogastropoda
- Order: Neogastropoda
- Family: Columbariidae
- Genus: Coluzea
- Species: C. madagascarensis

Binomial name
- Coluzea madagascarensis Harasewych, 2004

= Coluzea madagascarensis =

Species of gastropod

Coluzea madagascarensis is a species of large sea snail, marine gastropod mollusk in the family Columbariidae.

First described by malacologist M. G. Harasewych in 2004. [2][3]

== Description ==
The average length of the shell is 77 mm.

== Distribution ==
This marine species occurs off Madagascar.
