= Tropidofusus aequilonius =

Scientific classification
- Kingdom: Animalia
- Phylum: Mollusca
- Class: Gastropoda
- Subclass: Caenogastropoda
- Order: Neogastropoda
- Family: Columbariidae
- Genus: Tropidofusus
- Species: T. aequilonius

Binomial name
- Tropidofusus aequilonius Sysoev, 2000

Synonyms
- Fulgurofusus (Fulgurofusus) aequilonius Sysoev, 2000 (basionym); Fulgurofusus aequilonius Sysoev, 2000 (original combination)

Species of gastropod

Tropidofusus aequilonius is a species of large sea snail, marine gastropod mollusk in the family Columbariidae.

== Distribution ==
This species occurs in the Bering Sea.
