= Histricosceptrum bartletti =

Scientific classification
- Kingdom: Animalia
- Phylum: Mollusca
- Class: Gastropoda
- Subclass: Caenogastropoda
- Order: Neogastropoda
- Family: Columbariidae
- Genus: Histricosceptrum
- Species: H. bartletti

Binomial name
- Histricosceptrum bartletti (Clench & Aguayo, 1940)

Synonyms
- Columbarium bartletti Clench & Aguayo, 1940

Species of gastropod

Histricosceptrum bartletti is a species of large sea snail, marine gastropod mollusk in the family Turbinellidae.
