= Coluzea distephanotis =

Scientific classification
- Kingdom: Animalia
- Phylum: Mollusca
- Class: Gastropoda
- Subclass: Caenogastropoda
- Order: Neogastropoda
- Family: Columbariidae
- Genus: Coluzea
- Species: C. distephanotis

Binomial name
- Coluzea distephanotis (Melvill, 1891)

Synonyms
- Columbarium distephanotis Melvill, 1891

Species of gastropod

Coluzea distephanotis is a species of large sea snail, marine gastropod mollusk in the family Columbariidae.

== Description ==
Shell size 50 mm.

== Distribution ==
Australia: Northern Territory.
