= Coluzea angularis =

Scientific classification
- Kingdom: Animalia
- Phylum: Mollusca
- Class: Gastropoda
- Subclass: Caenogastropoda
- Order: Neogastropoda
- Family: Columbariidae
- Genus: Coluzea
- Species: C. angularis

Binomial name
- Coluzea angularis (Barnard, 1959)

Synonyms
- Columbarium angulare Barnard, 1959

Species of gastropod

Coluzea angularis is a species of large sea snail, marine gastropod mollusk in the family Columbariidae.
