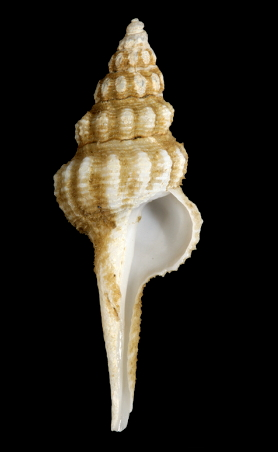
- Shell of Coluzea rotunda

Scientific classification
- Kingdom: Animalia
- Phylum: Mollusca
- Class: Gastropoda
- Subclass: Caenogastropoda
- Order: Neogastropoda
- Family: Columbariidae
- Genus: Coluzea
- Species: C. rotunda

Binomial name
- Coluzea rotunda (Barnard, 1959)

Synonyms
- Columbarium rotundum Barnard, 1959

= Coluzea rotunda =

Species of gastropod

Coluzea rotunda is a species of large sea snail, a marine gastropod mollusk in the family Columbariidae.

== Description ==
The length of the shell attains 75 mm.

The shell is relatively thin, with a long, slender, and straight siphonal canal. The whorls are rounded, with the periphery featuring at most low spines, primarily on the apical spire whorls. The rest of the shell is sculpted with rounded axial ribs intersected by spiral cords, which are most prominent below the periphery.

The shell is uniformly white, covered by a pale khaki-brown periostracum.

== Distribution ==
This marine species is endemic to South Africa and occurs off the west coast, off Atlantic Cape region (Alexander Bay to Cape Point), at depths between 200 m and 400 m.
