= Fulgurofusus brayi =

Scientific classification
- Kingdom: Animalia
- Phylum: Mollusca
- Class: Gastropoda
- Subclass: Caenogastropoda
- Order: Neogastropoda
- Family: Columbariidae
- Genus: Fulgurofusus
- Species: F. brayi

Binomial name
- Fulgurofusus brayi (Clench, 1959)

Synonyms
- Columbarium brayi Clench, 1959

Species of gastropod

Fulgurofusus brayi is a species of large sea snail, marine gastropod mollusk in the family Turbinellidae.
