= Coluzea altocanalis =

Scientific classification
- Kingdom: Animalia
- Phylum: Mollusca
- Class: Gastropoda
- Subclass: Caenogastropoda
- Order: Neogastropoda
- Family: Columbariidae
- Genus: Coluzea
- Species: C. altocanalis

Binomial name
- Coluzea altocanalis Dell, 1956

Synonyms
- Columbarium altocanalis (Dell, 1956); Coluzea spiralis Dell, 1956 - non A. Adams, 1856

Species of gastropod

Coluzea altocanalis is a species of large sea snail, marine gastropod mollusk in the family Columbariidae.

== Distribution ==
New Zealand.
