= Peristarium =

Scientific classification
- Kingdom: Animalia
- Phylum: Mollusca
- Class: Gastropoda
- Subclass: Caenogastropoda
- Order: Neogastropoda
- Family: Columbariidae
- Genus: Peristarium; Bayer, 1971

Genus of gastropods

Peristarium is a genus of sea snails, marine gastropod mollusks in the family Turbinellidae.

== Species ==
Species within the genus Peristarium include:

- Peristarium aurora (Bayer, 1971)
- Peristarium electra (Bayer, 1971)
- Peristarium merope (Bayer, 1971)
- Peristarium timor (Harasewych, 1983)
