= Fulgurofusus bermudezi =

Scientific classification
- Kingdom: Animalia
- Phylum: Mollusca
- Class: Gastropoda
- Subclass: Caenogastropoda
- Order: Neogastropoda
- Family: Columbariidae
- Genus: Fulgurofusus
- Species: F. bermudezi

Binomial name
- Fulgurofusus bermudezi (Clench & Aguayo, 1938)

Synonyms
- Columbarium bermudezi Clench & Aguayo, 1938

Species of gastropod

Fulgurofusus bermudezi is a species of large sea snail, marine gastropod mollusk in the family Turbinellidae.
