= Peristarium timor =

Scientific classification
- Kingdom: Animalia
- Phylum: Mollusca
- Class: Gastropoda
- Subclass: Caenogastropoda
- Order: Neogastropoda
- Family: Columbariidae
- Genus: Peristarium
- Species: P. timor

Binomial name
- Peristarium timor (Harasewych, 1983)

Synonyms
- Fulgurofusus timor Harasewych, 1983

Species of gastropod

Peristarium timor is a species of large sea snail, marine gastropod mollusk in the family Turbinellidae. It is found in the west Atlantic Ocean.
