= Histricosceptrum atlantis =

Scientific classification
- Kingdom: Animalia
- Phylum: Mollusca
- Class: Gastropoda
- Subclass: Caenogastropoda
- Order: Neogastropoda
- Family: Columbariidae
- Genus: Histricosceptrum
- Species: H. atlantis

Binomial name
- Histricosceptrum atlantis (Clench & Aguayo, 1938)

Synonyms
- Columbarium atlantis Clench & Aguayo, 1938

Species of gastropod

Histricosceptrum atlantis is a species of large sea snail, marine gastropod mollusk in the family Turbinellidae.
