= Coluzea eastwoodae =

Scientific classification
- Kingdom: Animalia
- Phylum: Mollusca
- Class: Gastropoda
- Subclass: Caenogastropoda
- Order: Neogastropoda
- Family: Columbariidae
- Genus: Coluzea
- Species: C. eastwoodae

Binomial name
- Coluzea eastwoodae (Kilburn, 1971)

Synonyms
- Columbarium eastwoodae Kilburn, 1971

Species of gastropod

Coluzea eastwoodae is a species of large sea snail, marine gastropod mollusk in the family Columbariidae.
