= Fustifusus =

Scientific classification
- Kingdom: Animalia
- Phylum: Mollusca
- Class: Gastropoda
- Subclass: Caenogastropoda
- Order: Neogastropoda
- Family: Columbariidae
- Genus: Fustifusus; Harasewych, 1991
- Species: F. pinicola

Binomial name
- Fustifusus pinicola (Darragh, 1987)

Genus of gastropods

Fustifusus is a genus of sea snails. There is a single species in the genus: Fustifusus pinicola.
