= Tropidofusus benthocallis =

Scientific classification
- Kingdom: Animalia
- Phylum: Mollusca
- Class: Gastropoda
- Subclass: Caenogastropoda
- Order: Neogastropoda
- Family: Columbariidae
- Genus: Tropidofusus
- Species: T. benthocallis

Binomial name
- Tropidofusus benthocallis (Melvill & Standen, 1907)

Synonyms
- Columbarium benthocallis Melvill & Standen, 1907; Fulgurofusus benthocallis (Melvill & Standen, 1907)

Species of gastropod

Tropidofusus benthocallis is a species of large sea snail, marine gastropod mollusc in the family Columbariidae.

== Distribution ==
This marine species occurs off the South Orkneys.
