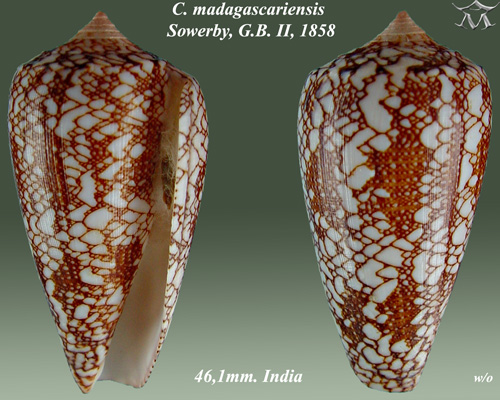
- Apertural and abapertural views of shell of Conus madagascariensis Sowerby, G.B. II, 1858
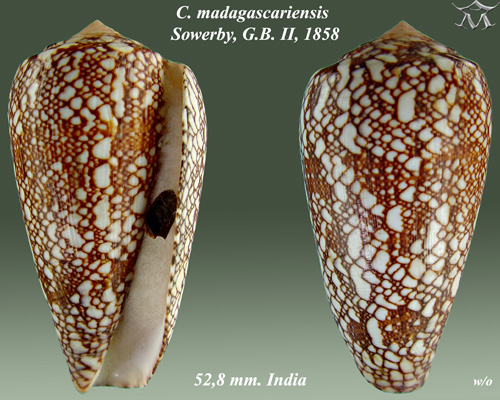

Conservation status
- Endangered (IUCN 3.1)

Scientific classification
- Kingdom: Animalia
- Phylum: Mollusca
- Class: Gastropoda
- Subclass: Caenogastropoda
- Order: Neogastropoda
- Superfamily: Conoidea
- Family: Conidae
- Genus: Conus
- Species: C. madagascariensis

Binomial name
- Conus madagascariensis Sowerby II, 1858

Synonyms
- Conus (Darioconus) madagascariensis G. B. Sowerby II, 1858 · accepted, alternate representation; Darioconus madagascariensis (G. B. Sowerby II, 1858)

= Conus madagascariensis =

Species of sea snail

Conus madagascariensis is a species of sea snail, a marine gastropod mollusk in the family Conidae, the cone snails and their allies.

Like all species within the genus Conus, these snails are predatory and venomous. They are capable of stinging humans.

== Description ==
The size of the shell varies between 44 mm and 81 mm.

== Distribution ==
This marine species occurs off Madagascar and Southern India.
