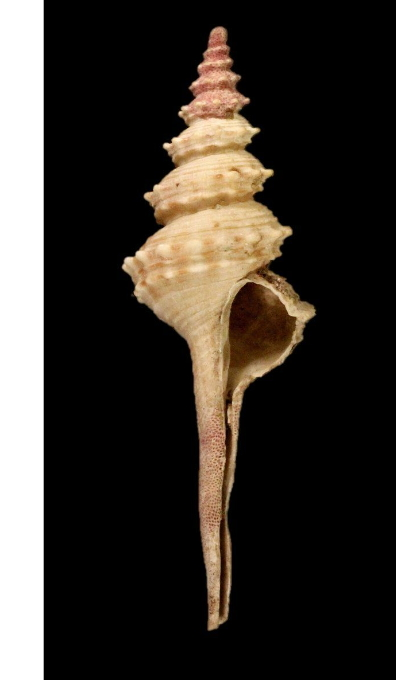
- Shell of Coluzea spiralis (specimen at Naturalis Biodiversity Center)

Scientific classification
- Kingdom: Animalia
- Phylum: Mollusca
- Class: Gastropoda
- Subclass: Caenogastropoda
- Order: Neogastropoda
- Family: Columbariidae
- Genus: Coluzea
- Species: C. spiralis

Binomial name
- Coluzea spiralis (A. Adams, 1856)

Synonyms
- Columbarium suteri E. A. Smith, 1915 (junior subjective synonym); † Coluzea espinosa H. J. Finlay, 1930 (junior subjective synonym); Fusus pensum F. W. Hutton, 1873 (junior subjective synonym); Fusus spiralis A. Adams, 1856

= Coluzea spiralis =

Species of gastropod

Coluzea spiralis is a species of very rare deepwater sea snail, a marine gastropod mollusc in the family Columbariidae.

== Distribution ==
This marine species is endemic and occurs off New Zealand.
