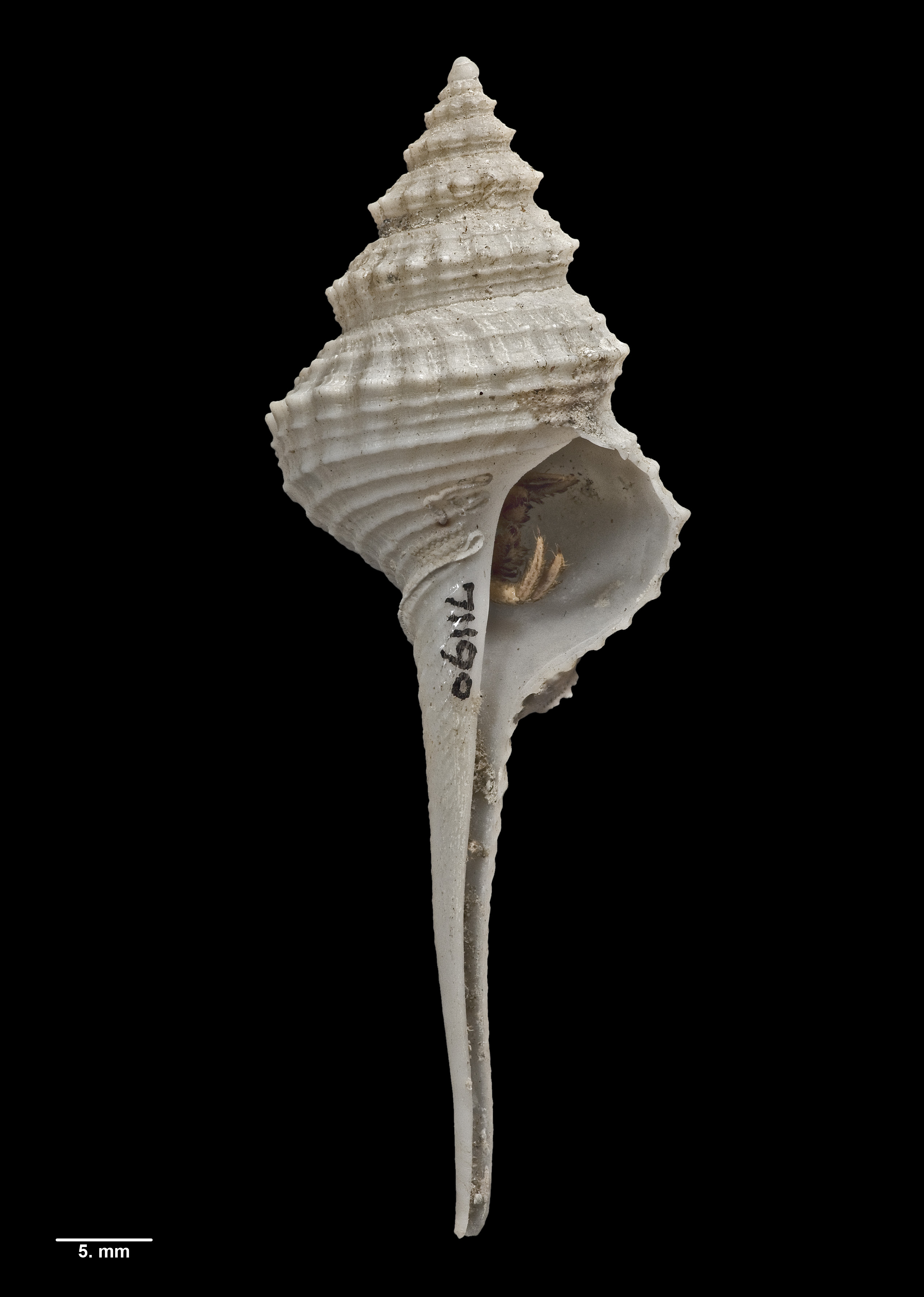
- Shell of Coluzea mariae (specimen at the Auckland War Memorial Museum)

Scientific classification
- Kingdom: Animalia
- Phylum: Mollusca
- Class: Gastropoda
- Subclass: Caenogastropoda
- Order: Neogastropoda
- Family: Columbariidae
- Genus: Coluzea
- Species: C. mariae

Binomial name
- Coluzea mariae Powell, 1952

Synonyms
- Columbella mariae (Powell, 1952)

= Coluzea mariae =

Species of gastropod

Coluzea mariae is a species of sea snail, a marine gastropod mollusc in the family Columbariidae.

== Distribution ==
This species occurs in New Zealand.
