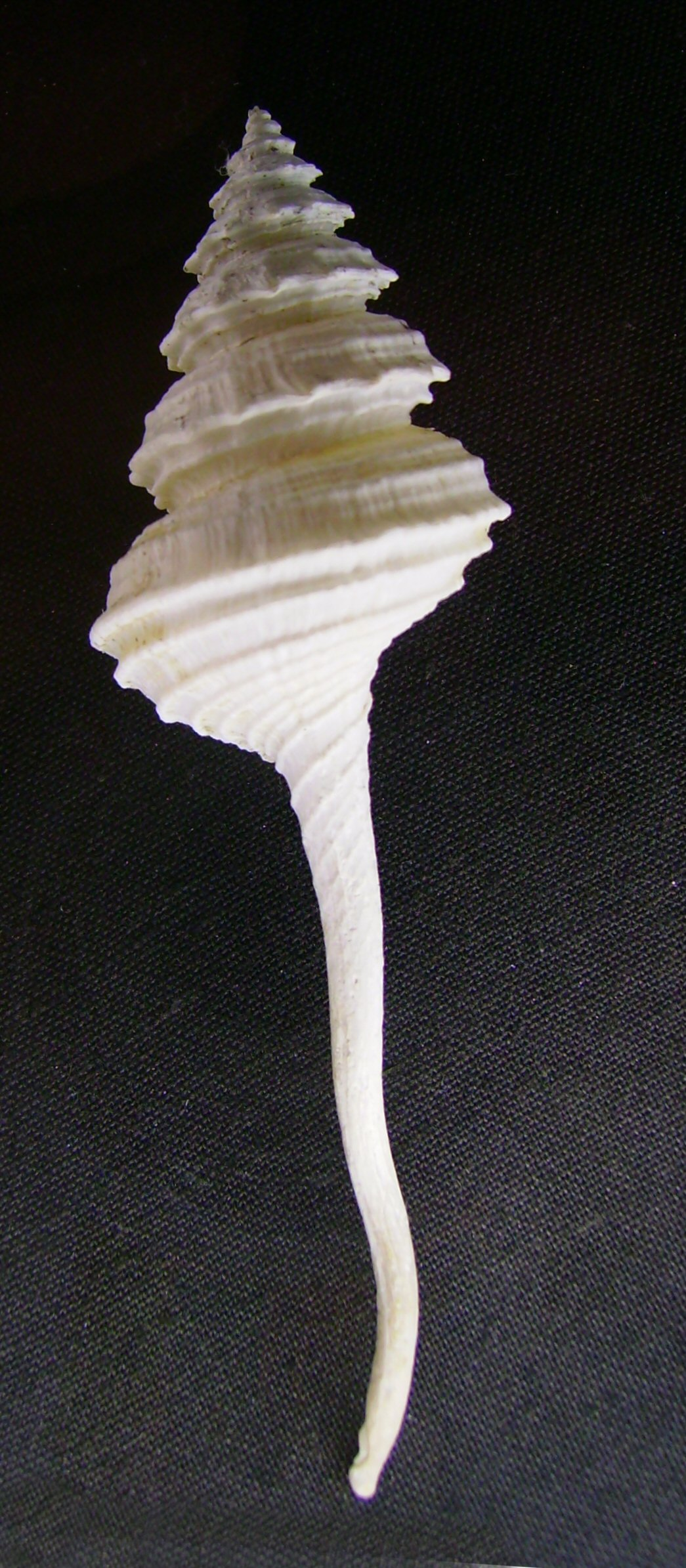
- Columbarium wormaldi

Scientific classification
- Kingdom: Animalia
- Phylum: Mollusca
- Class: Gastropoda
- Subclass: Caenogastropoda
- Order: Neogastropoda
- Superfamily: Turbinelloidea
- Family: Columbariidae; Tomlin, 1928

Synonyms
- Columbariinae Tomlin, 1928

= Columbariidae =

Family of gastropods

Columbariidae, known as pagoda shells, are a family of large deepwater sea snails, marine gastropod mollusks in the superfamily Turbinelloidea. Some 60 extant species have been described.

This family was previously considered a subfamily (Columbariinae) in the family Turbinellidae, according to the taxonomy of the Gastropoda by Bouchet & Rocroi in 2005.

== Distribution ==
Many columbariid species are found worldwide in deep water.

== Genera ==
Genera in the family Columbariidae include:

- † Clavogyra Leroy, 2018
- Columbarium - type genus
- Coluzea Finlay [in Allan], 1926
- Fulgurofusus
- Fustifusus
- Halia
- Histricosceptrum Darragh, 1969: synonym of Fulgurofusus (Histricosceptrum) Darragh, 1969 represented as Fulgurofusus Grabau, 1904
- Peristarium
- Pusionella
- Serratifusus
- Tropidofusus Harasewych, 2018

== Sources ==
- Tomlin J.R. le B. (1928). Reports on the marine Mollusca in the collections of the South African Museum, III. Revision of the South African Nassariidae (olim Nassidae). IV. Families Terebridae, Columbariidae, Thaididae, Architectonicidae. Annals of the South African Museum. 25(2): 313–335, pls 25–26. page(s): 330
- Bouchet P., Rocroi J.P., Hausdorf B., Kaim A., Kano Y., Nützel A., Parkhaev P., Schrödl M. & Strong E.E. (2017). Revised classification, nomenclator and typification of gastropod and monoplacophoran families. Malacologia. 61(1-2): 1-526
