= List of Hypericum nothospecies =

The genus Hypericum contains a number of nothospecies, or hybrids created directly from crossing two accepted species to create an intermediate organism that shares properties of both. Many of these hybrid species are used as ornamental or decorative plants.

== Nothospecies ==
Binomial	Common name	Type	Distribution	Parentage	Image	References
Section Adenosepalum
H. × joerstadii Lid (1968)		Intermediate shrub		H. glandulosum × H. reflexum		
H. pubescens × tomentosum				H. pubescens × H. tomentosum		
Section Androsaemum
H. × inodorum Mill. (1768)	Tall Tutsan	Deciduous shrub	Corsica, France, Italy, Spain			
Section Ascyreia
H. kouytchense × calycinum D.Walker		Shrub	Only in cultivation	H. kouytchense × H. calycinum		
H. × cyathiflorum N.Robson (1985)		Shrub	Only in cultivation	H. addingtonii × H. hookerianum		
H. × dummeri N.Robson (1985)		Shrub	Only in cultivation	H. calycinum × H. forrestii		
H. × moserianum André (1889)		Shrub	Only in cultivation			
Section Drosocarpium
H. × reinosae A. Ramos (1983)		Perennial herb		H. perforatum × H. richeri subsp. burseri		
Section Graveolentia
H. × mitchellianum Rydb. (1927)	Blue Ridge St. John's Wort	Perennial herb		H. graveolens × H. punctatum		
Section Hypericum
H. × desetangsii Lamotte (1874)	Des Etang's St. John's Wort			H. perforatum × H. maculatum		
H. × hyugamontanum Y. Kimura		Perennial herb	Japan (Kyushu)			
H. × laschii A.Fröhl.			Scandinavia, France, Central Europe			
H. × medium Peterm.			Austria, Czech Republic, France, Germany, Romania			
Section Oligostema
H. × caesariense Druce ex N.Robson		Perennial herb	Scotland, Northern England	H. linariifolium × H. humifusum		
Section Trigynobrathys
H. × dissimulatum E.P.Bicknell	Disguised St. John's Wort			H. boreale × H. canadense		
