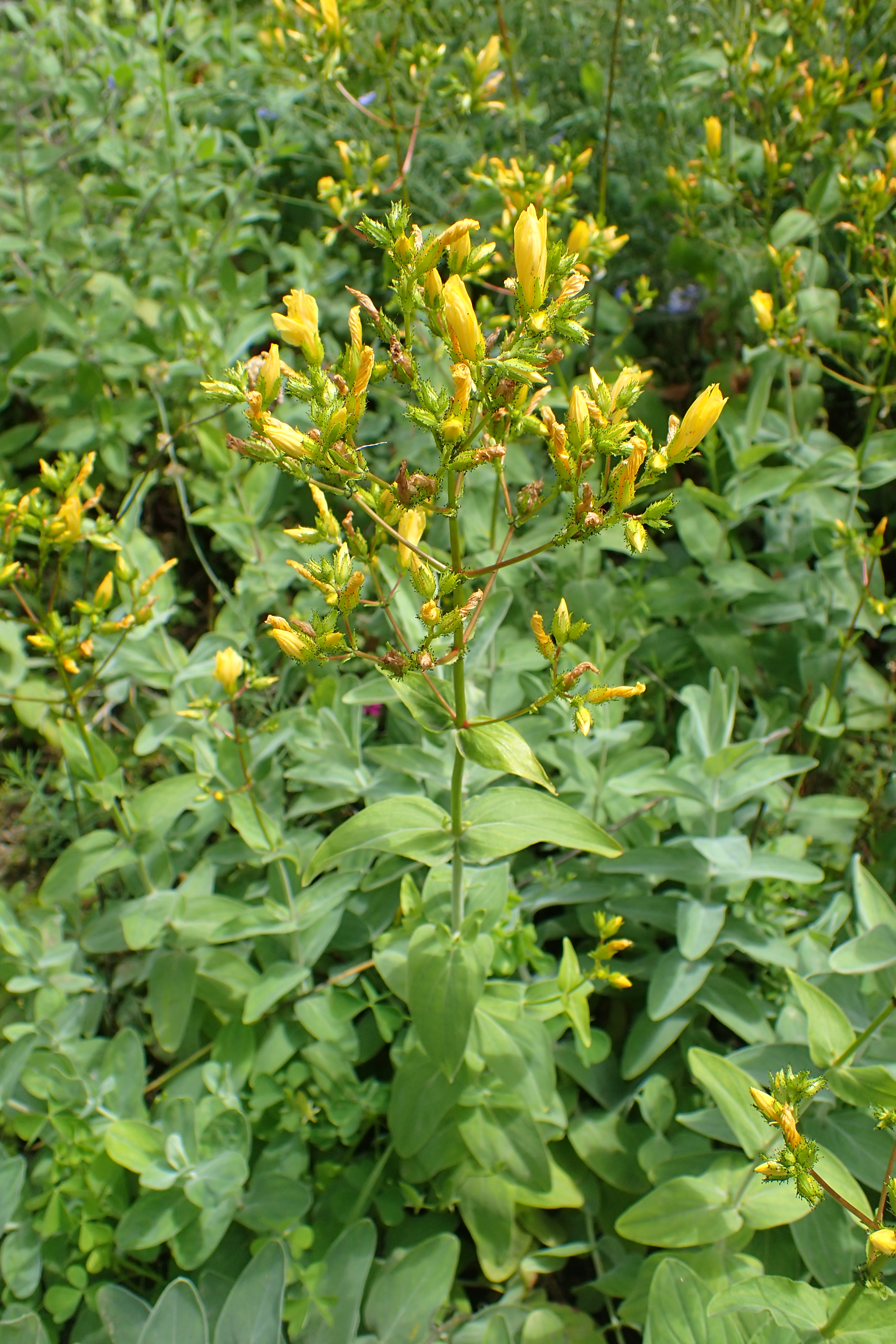

Scientific classification
- Kingdom: Plantae
- Clade: Tracheophytes
- Clade: Angiosperms
- Clade: Eudicots
- Clade: Rosids
- Order: Malpighiales
- Family: Hypericaceae
- Genus: Hypericum
- Section: Hypericum sect. Adenosepalum
- Species: H. annulatum

Binomial name
- Hypericum annulatum Moris

= Hypericum annulatum =

Species of flowering plant in the St John's wort family

Hypericum annulatum is a species of flowering plant in the family Hypericaceae. It is a perennial herb of varying heights which grows upright, with more than a hundred flowers of a golden yellow color. First described in 1827, the species has a wide distribution from Eastern Europe to East Africa, and its appearance can vary greatly based on its geographic location. It has been used in Bulgarian folk medicine, and has more recently been investigated for its effectiveness in slowing the growth of or killing certain types of human cancer.

== Description ==
Hypericum annulatum is a perennial herb which grows upright, with erect stems. Plants of the species can grow up to 75 cm (30 in) tall, but they will often be as short as 20 cm (7.9 in). Sometimes, the plants will have a short lower section which lies on the ground. However, its roots are not visible at the base, and it has a woody taproot. It is covered in downy soft hairs of a whitish color which are either very fine or tend towards becoming hairless. It either lacks branches below the inflorescence or has short offshoots from the main stems.

=== Stems ===
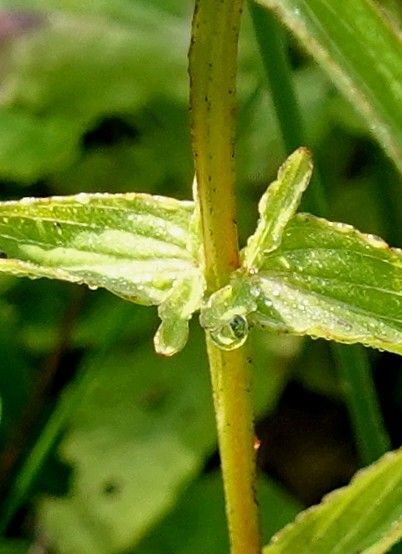
Stem detail

The species' stems are a color between green and reddish. They are of a terete shape, that being roughly cylindrical. The distance between the leaves on the stem is always shorter than the leaves themselves. There may or may not be glands on the stems; if there are only a few glands, they will be spread sparsely along lines, while is there are many glands they will be densely dotted or streaked.

=== Leaves ===
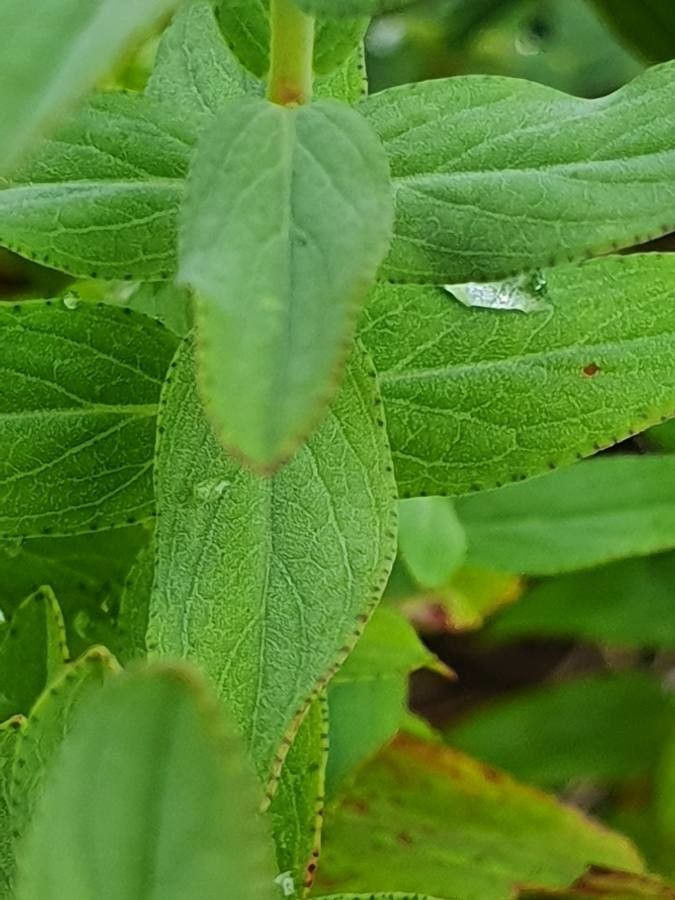
Glands and veins of the leaves

The leaves are attached directly to the stem and have a shape which is roughly like that of an oval, though they may be more narrow. They have a texture similar to that of thin paper, and the underside is more pale than the upper surface. The leaf blades measure 5–32 mm (0.20–1.26 in) wide and 5–32 mm (0.20–1.26 in) long. They are more or less pointed at their end, and are rounded or slightly heart-shaped at the base. The leaves are either densely covered with very short hairs or lack hairs entirely. These hairs are shorter on the upper surface and shorter on the underside.

There are translucent dot-shaped glands which are difficult to see, usually accompanied by black glands around the edges of the leaf blade. These are especially present at the tip of the lead and on the underside. The underside also sometimes has scattered black glands, though sometimes these are totally absent. The leaf will usually have four or five pairs of lateral veins, which curve out from the lower half of the midrib. The small tertiary veins which branch from the lateral veins are dense, but not easily visible.

=== Inflorescence ===
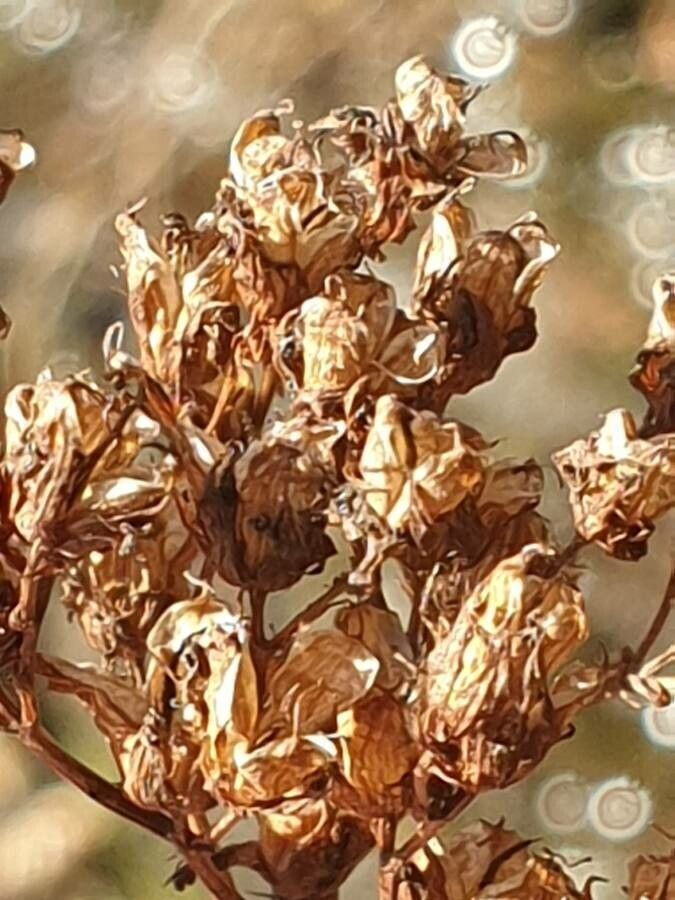
Dried inflorescence

Each plant has around five inflorescences which have 120 flowers coming from up to four different nodes. The shape of these inflorescences is roughly like that of a pyramid, but they can also appear closer to a cylinder. The lower nodes are not distinct from other nodes within the inflorescence. The pedicels are 1–4 mm (0.039–0.157 in) long. The bracts and bracteoles, small leaf-like structures surrounding the inflorescence, are linear in shape. They have black, glandular bumps and dense auriculate glands.

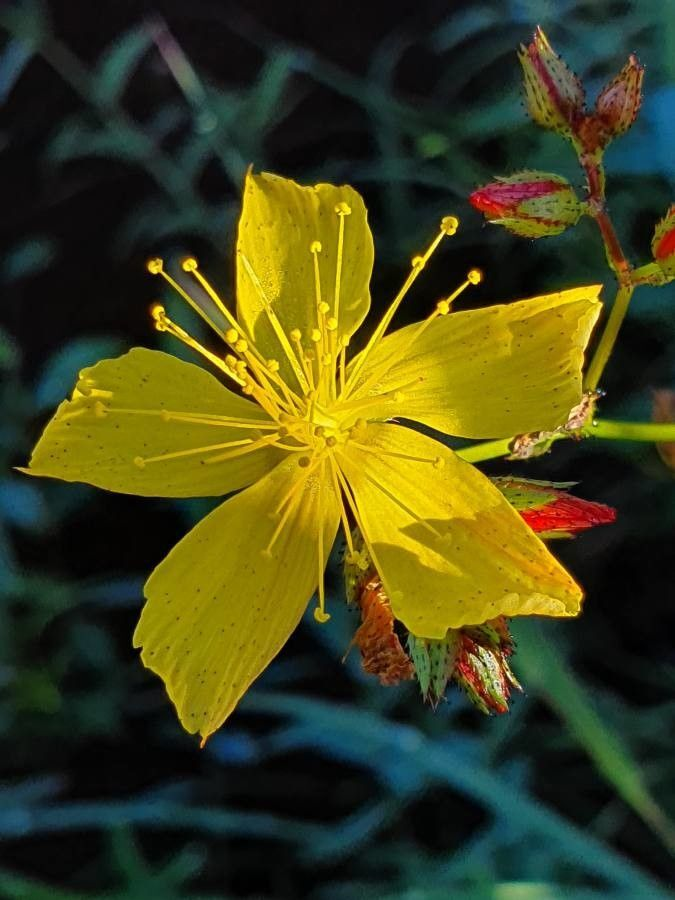
Flower in full bloom

The flowers have a rather loose arrangement in many-branched cymes, in which the central flower blossoms first. They are 15–25 mm (0.59–0.98 in) in diameter and have rounded ends, with buds that are shaped like cylinders or ellipsoids. The petals are usually golden yellow but can be pale, and sometimes have visible veins or a red tinge. They each measure 10–13 mm (0.39–0.51 in) long by 3–3.5 mm (0.12–0.14 in) wide, and there are roughly twice as many of them as there are sepals. They are an oblong lance-like shape with rounded ends and they lack an apiculus, or tip. They have scattered glands on their surface which can be pale or black, but they lack glands around their edges.

The sepals at the base of the flower are usually 5–6 mm (0.20–0.24 in) long and 1–1.5 mm (0.039–0.059 in) wide, but they can be as short as 4 mm (0.16 in) or as long as 8 mm (0.31 in). They are roughly equal in size and are free or nearly so from the rest of the flower. The sepals are narrow and either oblong or lance shaped. They have pointed tips, and around the edges there are short and long ciliate glands. There are either three or five veins on each sepal, which have large outer branches from each lateral vein, which can sometimes join together at the base. They have glands on their blades which can range from all pale to all black or a mix of the two. The glands are either linear in shape at the base, or are all point shaped. Around the edges, the glands are black and flat-topped.

There are roughly 20-40 stamens, the longest of which measure 9–10 mm (0.35–0.39 in). The ovary is 2–3 mm (0.079–0.118 in) by 1–2 mm (0.039–0.079 in) in size and is a narrow shape between an oval and a pyramid. There are three styles which are 6–8 mm (0.24–0.31 in) long and curve inward.

=== Seeds ===
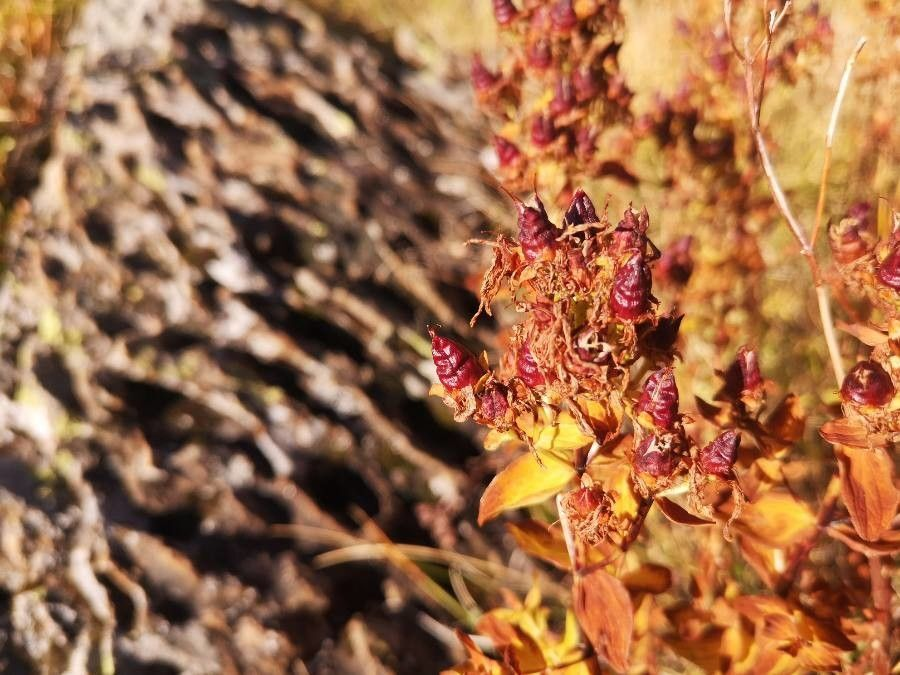
The petals of H. annulatum enclose the developing seed capsules.

The seed capsule is 5–8 mm (0.20–0.31 in) by 2.5–4 mm (0.098–0.157 in) in size and is three-valved. They are ovoid in shape, equal in size to or larger than the sepals. When they are developing, they are enclosed by the petals, which twist together. The seeds are a dark yellow-brown color.

=== Similar species ===
Hypericum annulatum is most closely related to H. montanum, which is its sister species.

== Taxonomy ==
Hypericum annulatum was first described in 1827 by Giuseppe Moris in the ninth volume of the botanical journal Stirpium Sardoarum Elenchus.

=== Subspecies ===
Hypericum annulatum has three subspecies:

- Hypericum annulatum subsp. afromontanum (Bullock) N.Robson
- Hypericum annulatum subsp. annulatum
- Hypericum annulatum subsp. intermedium (Steud. ex A.Rich.) N.Robson

These subspecies roughly correspond to different geographic ranges within Hypericum annulatum's wide distribution. Subsp. annulatum represents the European populations, which have hairier stems and lack black glands. Subsp. intermedium is found on the Arabian Peninsula, and vary in their hairiness from north to south. Subsp. intermedium is found in eastern Africa, and also varies in characteristics, though they always have long cilia on their sepals and red-tinged petals.

== Distribution and habitat ==
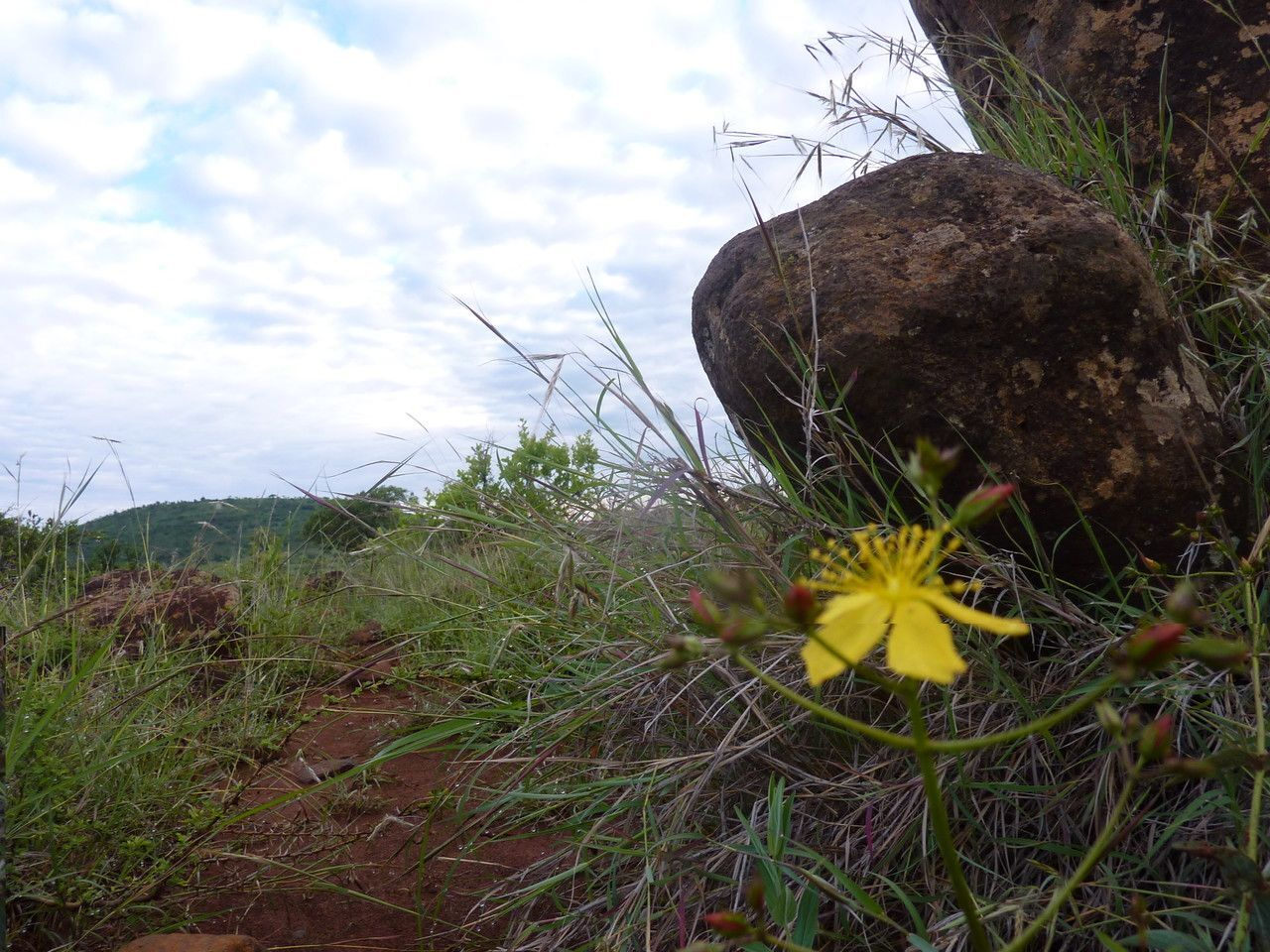
H. annulatum is found in dry, stony habitats.

Hypericum annulatum has been found across Eastern Europe, East Africa, and the Middle East. It has been recorded as native to Albania, Bulgaria, Eritrea, Ethiopia, Greece, Kenya, Sardinia, Saudi Arabia, Sudan, Tanzania, Uganda, and Yugoslavia. It has also been introduced to Czechoslovakia and Switzerland.

The species' habitat is on dry hillsides in upland regions. It is found in grasslands and moors among stones and in scrub at elevations ranging from 1,100 m (3,600 ft) to 2,700 m (8,900 ft).

== Phytochemistry ==
=== Essential oil ===
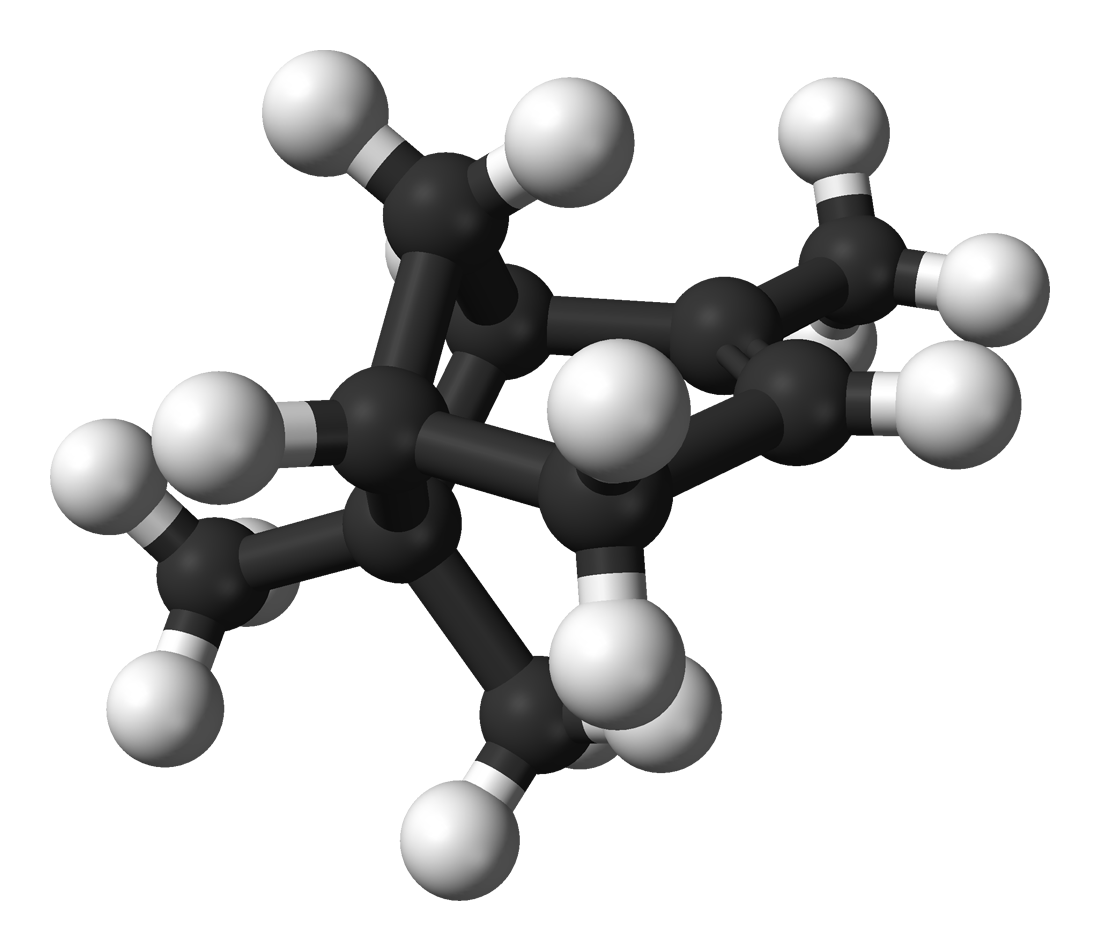
Ball-and-stick model of alpha-pinene, the most prominent essential oil of H. annulatum

Essential oils are present in the inflorescence, unripe fruit, leaves, and stems of Hypericum annulatum. The overall oil composition extracted from the species is a pale yellow color and has a pungent smell, and more than 116 different compounds make up its composition. In decreasing order of presence, the major constituent compounds are alpha-pinene, (E)-beta-ocimene, undecane, myrcene, and beta-pinene. Overall, the oil is characterized by a large concentration of terpenoids.

The phytochemical profile of Hypericum annulatum varies greatly from other species of Hypericum, even those within sect. Adenosepalum or from a similar geographic range. While H. annulatum has mostly monoterpenoids, H. atomarium and H. delphicum are dominated by sesquiterpenoids and H. tomentosum has a roughly equal amount of mono- and sesquiterpenoids. Despite H. tomentosum also having alpha-pinene as a major constituent, a trait not shared by other species of sect. Adenosepalum, the oxygenation pattern and skeleton of the compound differ between the two species. Still, H. tomentosum appears to have the most similar essential oil profile to H. annulatum.

=== Antitoxin ===
The above ground parts of Hypericum annulatum contain benzophenone glycosides and xanthones which have been demonstrated to protect cells from certain toxins and reduce the impact those toxins have on their viability.

=== Anticancer ===
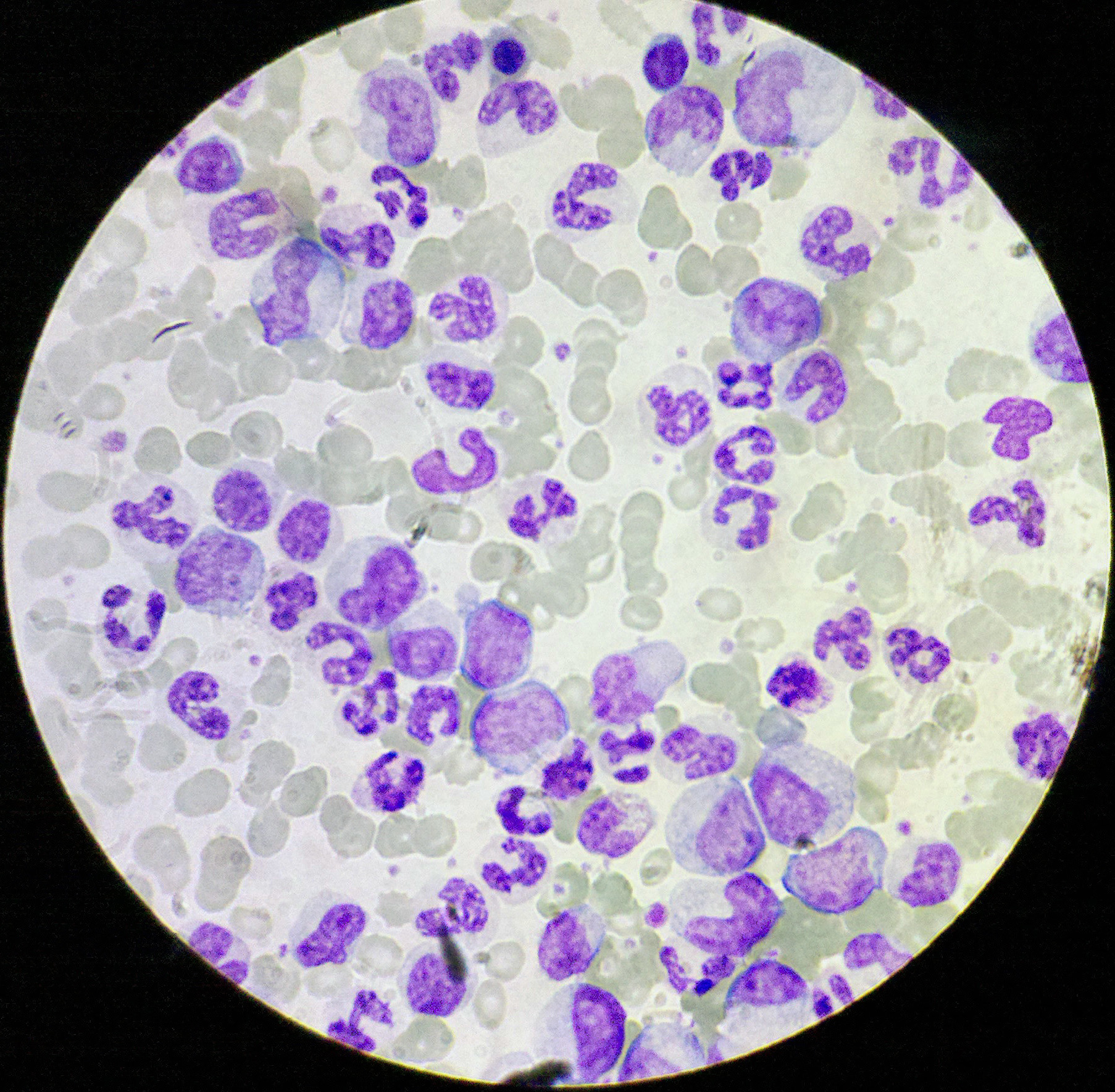
Compounds from H. annulatum may slow the growth of chronic myelogenous leukemia cells in humans.

Hypericum annulatum contains a newly discovered isocoumarin called annulatomarin which has been found in the above ground parts of the plant. This new substance somewhat slows the growth of human chronic myelogenous leukemia LAMA-84 cells. In addition, parietin and beta-sitosterol, two already known compounds, were also isolated. Parietin has been shown to kill human leukemia cells and inhibit the growth of other types of cancers, while being apparently non-toxic to healthy cells. Beta-sitosterol also has possible uses to reduce benign prostatic hyperplasia and blood cholesterol levels.

Another possible anticancer compound found in the species is hyperatomarin, a prenylated phloroglucinol, which has a relatively high concentration of about 3% in extracts from the plant. It has been demonstrated to be effective against several different lines of human tumor cells. The compound also has the advantage of being more stable than hyperforin, another phloroglucinol which is found across the genus Hypericum.

== Uses ==
In Bulgaria, Hypericum annulatum has been used in folk medicine to treat stomach and liver disorders. However, as of 2022, no modern pharmacological investigations have been performed on the species, and its medicinal properties remain uncertain.
