= Hypericum annulatum subsp. intermedium =

Scientific classification
- Kingdom: Plantae
- Clade: Tracheophytes
- Clade: Angiosperms
- Clade: Eudicots
- Clade: Rosids
- Order: Malpighiales
- Family: Hypericaceae
- Genus: Hypericum
- Species: H. annulatum
- Subspecies: H. a. subsp. intermedium

Trinomial name
- Hypericum annulatum subsp. intermedium (Steud. ex A.Rich.) N.Robson

Subspecies of flowering plant

Hypericum annulatum subsp. intermedium is a subspecies of Hypericum annulatum, which is a species of the genus Hypericum. It was described by Norman Keith Bonner Robson.

== Dispersion ==
The subspecies can be found in Northeast Tropical Africa, in Eritrea, Ethiopia, Sudan. It is also found in the Arabian Peninsula, in Saudi Arabia, Yemen, Oman, and Qatar.
