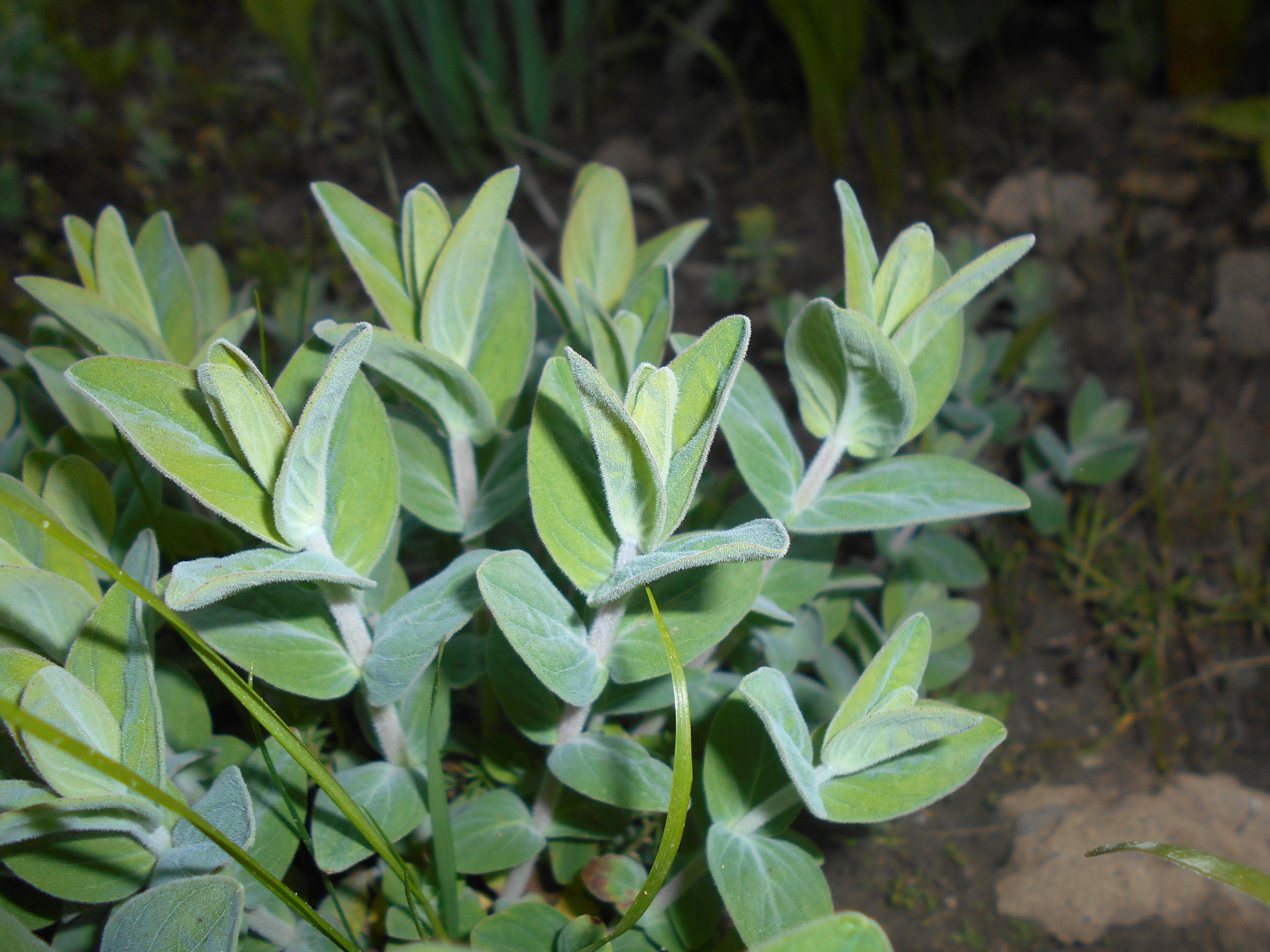

Scientific classification
- Kingdom: Plantae
- Clade: Tracheophytes
- Clade: Angiosperms
- Clade: Eudicots
- Clade: Rosids
- Order: Malpighiales
- Family: Hypericaceae
- Genus: Hypericum
- Species: H. annulatum Moris
- Subspecies: H. a. subsp. annulatum

Trinomial name
- Hypericum annulatum subsp. annulatum

= Hypericum annulatum subsp. annulatum =

Subspecies of flowering plant

Hypericum annulatum subsp. annulatum is a subspecies of Hypericum annulatum, which is a species of the genus Hypericum.

== Description ==
The subspecies has a single stem with many black glands. The leaves also have numerous black glands. Its sepals have cilia that are twice as long as its glands. Its petals are red tinged and also have black glands.

== Distribution ==
The subspecies can be found in Bosnia & Herzegovina, Macedonia, Sardinia, Albania, Bulgaria, Greece, and Switzerland.
