= Hypericum annulatum subsp. afromontanum =

Scientific classification
- Kingdom: Plantae
- Clade: Tracheophytes
- Clade: Angiosperms
- Clade: Eudicots
- Clade: Rosids
- Order: Malpighiales
- Family: Hypericaceae
- Genus: Hypericum
- Species: H. annulatum
- Subspecies: H. a. subsp. afromontanum

Trinomial name
- Hypericum annulatum subsp. afromontanum (Bullock) N. Robson

Synonyms
- Hypericum afromontanum Bullock

Subspecies of flowering plant

Hypericum annulatum subsp. afromontanum is a subspecies of Hypericum annulatum. It can be found in Ethiopia, Kenya, Tanzania and Uganda. It was described by Arthur Allman Bullock.
