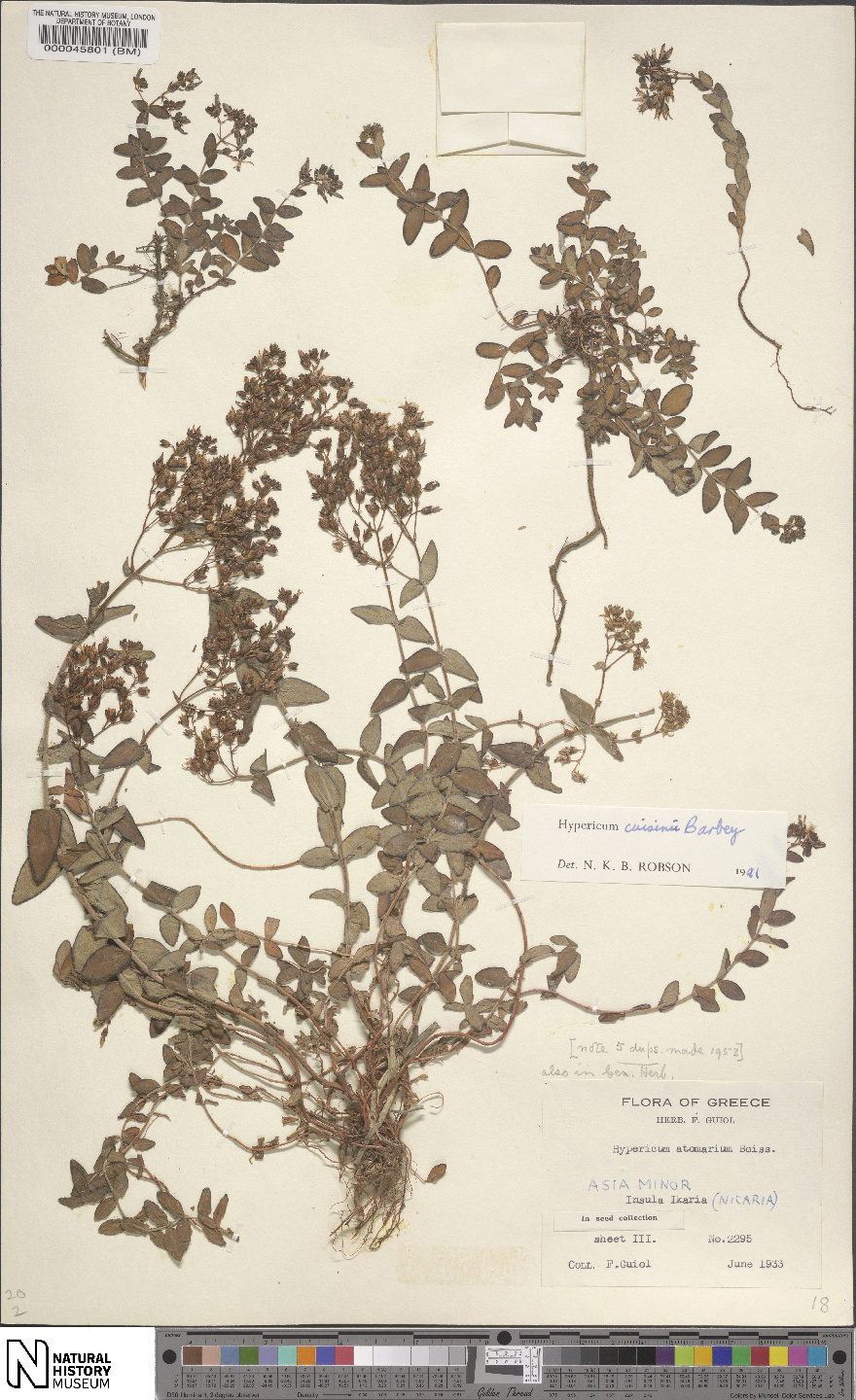
- Specimen of Hypericum atomarium at the National History Museum in London

Scientific classification
- Kingdom: Plantae
- Clade: Tracheophytes
- Clade: Angiosperms
- Clade: Eudicots
- Clade: Rosids
- Order: Malpighiales
- Family: Hypericaceae
- Genus: Hypericum
- Section: Hypericum sect. Adenosepalum
- Species: H. atomarium

Binomial name
- Hypericum atomarium Boiss.

= Hypericum atomarium =

Species of flowering plant

Hypericum atomarium is a perennial herb in the Hypericaceae family. It stands 20–80 centimeters (8–31 in) tall with flowers 1–2 centimeters (0.4–0.8 in) in diameter.
