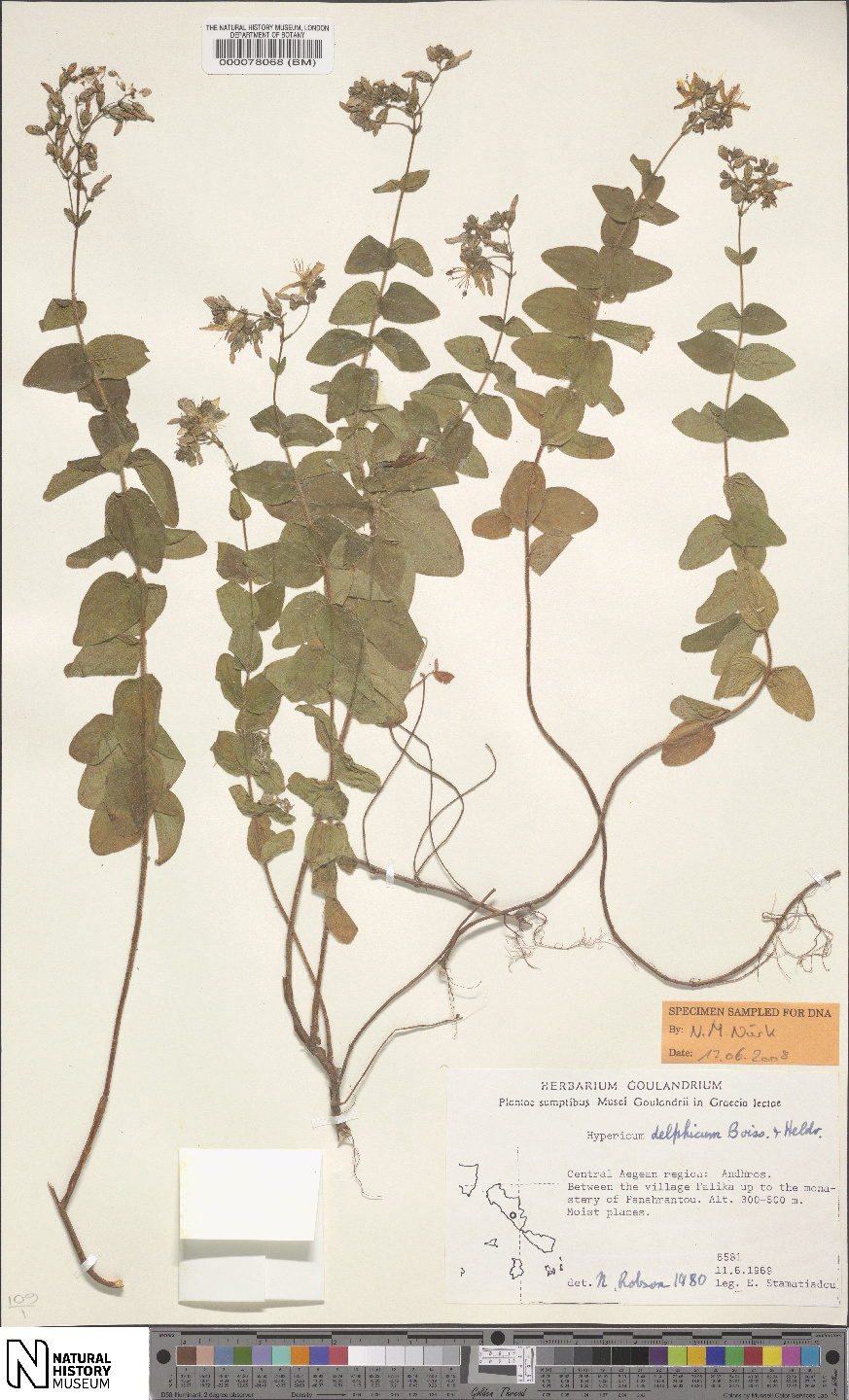

Scientific classification
- Kingdom: Plantae
- Clade: Tracheophytes
- Clade: Angiosperms
- Clade: Eudicots
- Clade: Rosids
- Order: Malpighiales
- Family: Hypericaceae
- Genus: Hypericum
- Section: Hypericum sect. Adenosepalum
- Species: H. delphicum

Binomial name
- Hypericum delphicum Boiss. & Heldr.

= Hypericum delphicum =

Species of flowering plant in the St John's wort family

Hypericum delphicum is a perennial herb in the St. John's wort family Hypericaceae, section Adenosepalum and the subsection Adenosepalum. It has a diploid number of 16.

== Distribution and habitat ==
Hypericum delphicum is located in the Evvoia and Andros regions of Greece, and can be found in damp and shady places among rocks. The species typically grows at the altitudes of 300–1,700 meters (980–5,580 ft) above sea level.

== Description ==
Hypericum delphicum is a perennial herb that grows 30–50 cm (12–20 in) tall. The plant has an herbaceous taproot from which grow many stems. The stems lack branches below the inflorescence. The sessile leaves have an obtuse base and a rounded tip. The pale yellow flowers are 12–15 mm (0.47–0.59 in) wide. The dark brown seeds are 0.6 mm (0.024 in) long.
