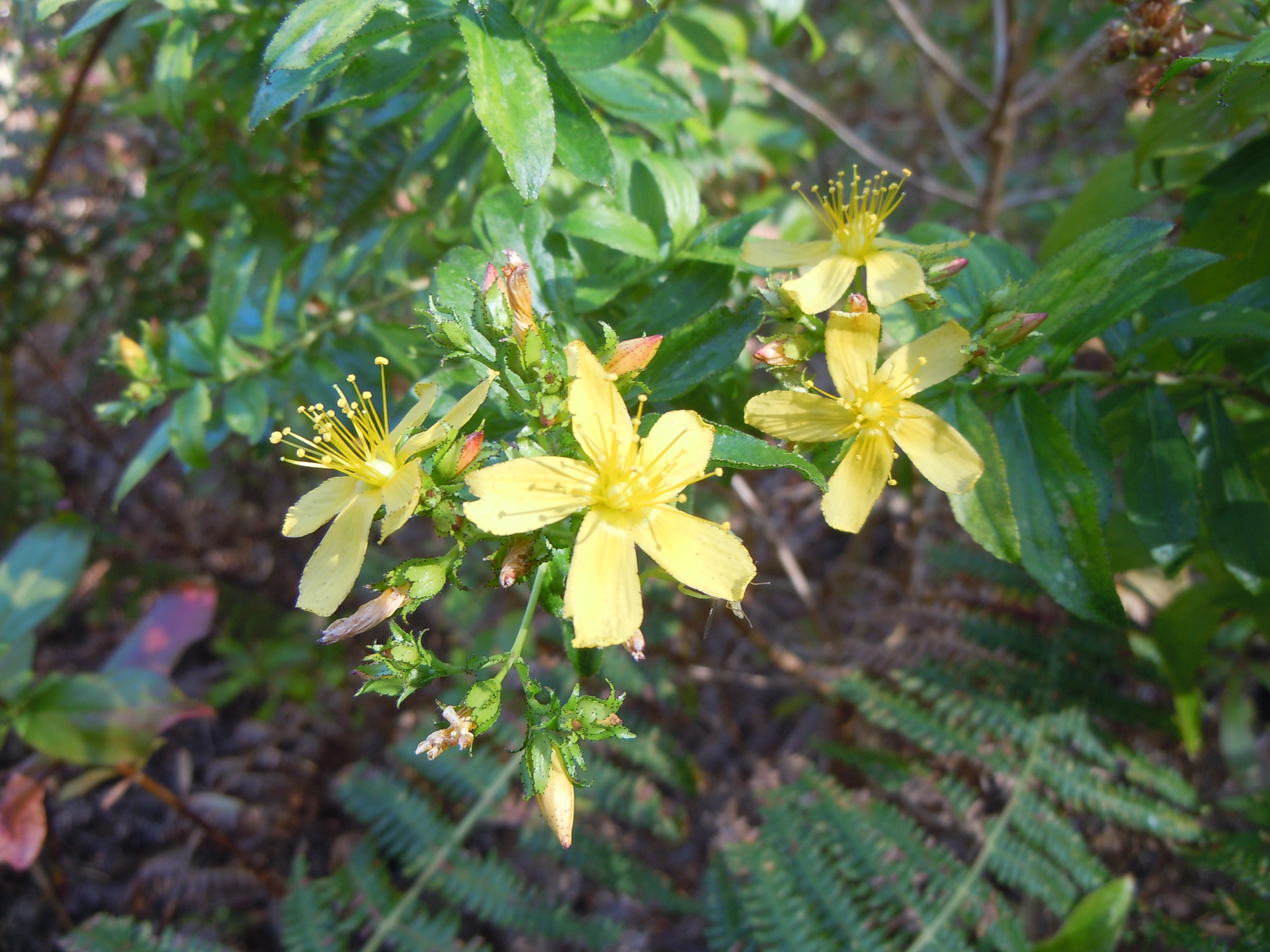

Scientific classification
- Kingdom: Plantae
- Clade: Tracheophytes
- Clade: Angiosperms
- Clade: Eudicots
- Clade: Rosids
- Order: Malpighiales
- Family: Hypericaceae
- Genus: Hypericum
- Subsection: H. subsect. Aethiopica
- Species: H. glandulosum

Binomial name
- Hypericum glandulosum Aiton

= Hypericum glandulosum =

Species of flowering plant

Hypericum glandulosum is a perennial herb in the genus Hypericum, in the section Adenosepalum, subsect. Aethiopicum.

== Medicinal Uses ==
According to a study done on the effects of Hypericum glandulosum on mice, the plant has topical anti-inflammatory, analgesic activities, and anti-depressant properties, suggesting a potential for local medicinal uses in inflammatory illnesses.
