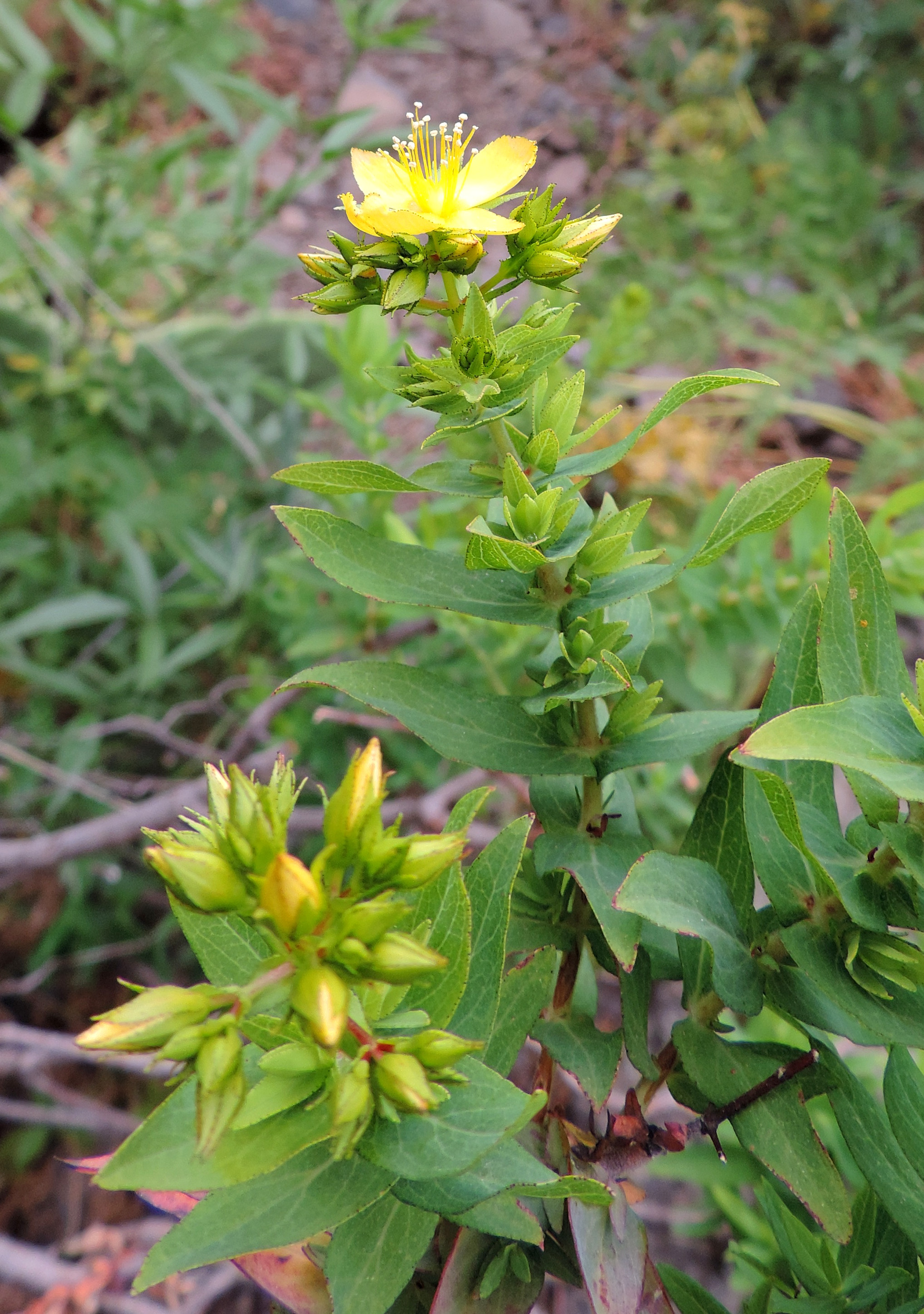

Scientific classification
- Kingdom: Plantae
- Clade: Tracheophytes
- Clade: Angiosperms
- Clade: Eudicots
- Clade: Rosids
- Order: Malpighiales
- Family: Hypericaceae
- Genus: Hypericum
- Section: Hypericum sect. Adenosepalum
- Subsection: H. subsect. Adenosepalum
- Species: H. reflexum

Binomial name
- Hypericum reflexum L.f.

= Hypericum reflexum =

Species of flowering plant

Hypericum reflexum is a species of plant in the St. Johns wort family, Hypericaceae, endemic to the Canary Islands. It is a small shrub up to 1 m (3 ft 3 in) in height with opposite, sessile leaves up to 25 mm (0.98 in) long and 12 mm (0.47 in) across. The flowerheads produce 5–40 bright yellow flowers with five petals each.

Hypericum reflexum was described in 1782 by Carl Linnaeus the Younger.
