= Hypericum addingtonii =

Scientific classification
- Kingdom: Plantae
- Clade: Tracheophytes
- Clade: Angiosperms
- Clade: Eudicots
- Clade: Rosids
- Order: Malpighiales
- Family: Hypericaceae
- Genus: Hypericum
- Section: H. sect. Ascyreia
- Species: H. addingtonii

Binomial name
- Hypericum addingtonii N.Robson

Species of flowering plant in the St John's wort family

Hypericum addingtonii is a shrubby species of flowering plant in the family Hypericaceae. It is native to China and was described by Norman Robson in 1985.

== Description ==
Hypericum addingtonii ranges from 1.5 to 2 meters (4 ft 11 in to 6 ft 7 in) in height. Its stems are yellow-brown.

== Distribution and habitat ==
The species is found in parts of China, in northwestern and western Yunnan bamboo thickets, grassy slopes, and hemlock forest edges.

== Name ==
Hypericum addingtonii is known as die hua jin si tao in Chinese and Addington hypericum in English. It was named for its collector, P. Addington.
