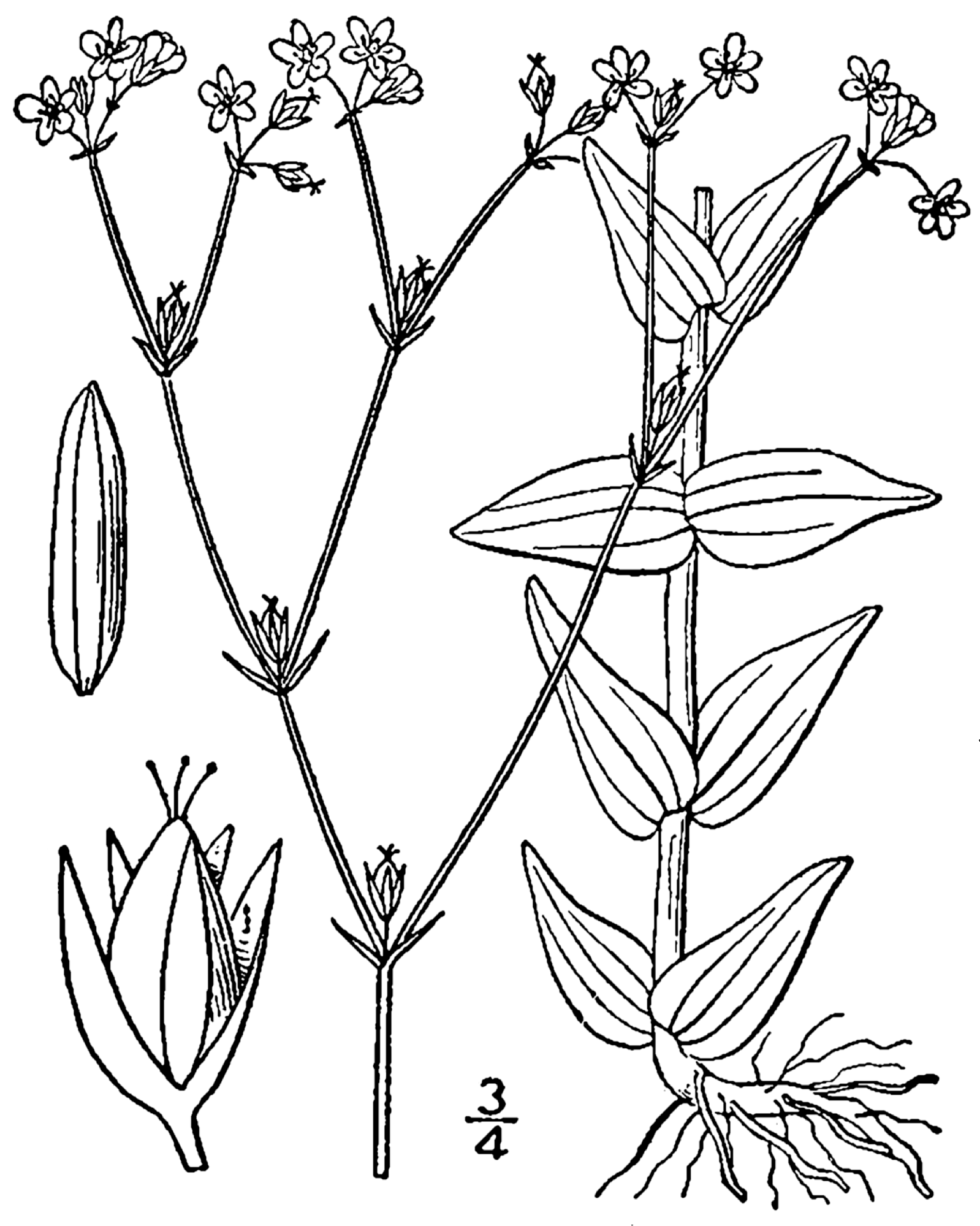

Scientific classification
- Kingdom: Plantae
- Clade: Tracheophytes
- Clade: Angiosperms
- Clade: Eudicots
- Clade: Rosids
- Order: Malpighiales
- Family: Hypericaceae
- Genus: Hypericum
- Section: H. sect. Trigynobrathys
- Subsection: H. subsect. Knifa
- Species: H. gymnanthum

Binomial name
- Hypericum gymnanthum Engelm. & Gray

Synonyms
- Hypericum canadense var. cardiophyllum R.Keller; Hypericum mutilum var. gymnanthum (Engelm. & A.Gray) A.Gray; Sarothra gymnantha (Engelm. & A.Gray) Y.Kimura

= Hypericum gymnanthum =

Species of flowering plant in the St John's wort family

Hypericum gymnanthum, the small-flowered St. John's wort or clasping leaf St. John's wort, is a species of flowering plant in the St. John's wort family Hypericaceae. It was first formally described in 1845.

== Description ==
H. gymnanthum ranges in height from 0.3 to 1 meters (approximately 1 to 3 feet) in height. Each yellow flower has five petals, each being 3 to 6 millimeters long. Its lower leaves are significantly smaller than its upper leaves, which are 1.5 centimeters long and 1 centimeter wide.

== Distribution and habitat ==
This species' range encompasses the eastern United States, from Florida to New York, and it also occurs in Guatemala. It has been introduced to Poland.

It is commonly found in wet habitats such as sinkhole ponds, wet pine flatwoods, bogs, swales, and pine savannas. The United States Department of Agriculture classifies H. gymnanthum as a facultative wetland species.
