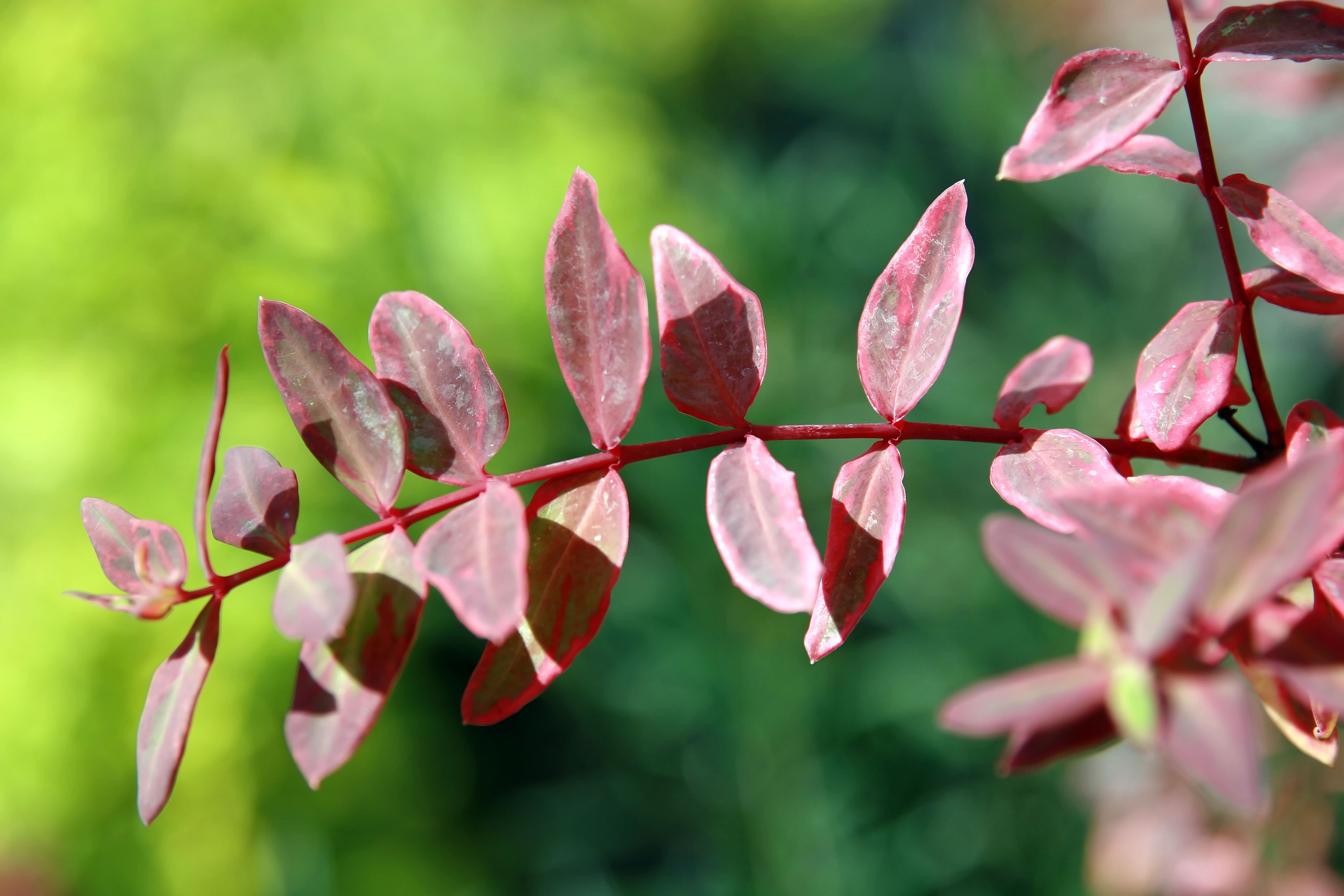

Scientific classification
- Kingdom: Plantae
- Clade: Tracheophytes
- Clade: Angiosperms
- Clade: Eudicots
- Clade: Rosids
- Order: Malpighiales
- Family: Hypericaceae
- Genus: Hypericum
- Species: H. × moserianum

Binomial name
- Hypericum × moserianum André

Synonyms
- Hypericum × moserianum f. tricolor; Hypericum × moserianum var. tricolor

= Hypericum × moserianum =

Species of legume

Hypericum × moserianum is a flowering artificial hybrid in the family Hypericaceae. It is the result of a cross between Hypericum calycinum and Hypericum patulum. It flowers in Summer and Autumn (July–October).

== Description ==
Its foliage is deciduous. Hypericum × moserianum flowers grow to 5 cm in width, has golden-yellow with reddish anthers, and has ovate leaves. It grows between 10 and 50 cm, spreads 50 to 100 cm, and takes 2 to 5 years to reach the maximum height. As well as that, it produces berries.

== Toxicity ==
While there is not much information about toxicity, it is advised against ingesting the fruits.

== Cultivation ==
In general, this hybrid plant is considered low-maintenance. It usually grows well in well-drained soil under direct or partial sunlight. It is propagated using semi-hardwood cuttings.

=== Pests and diseases ===
The hybrid is generally not known to be susceptible to pests, but may be vulnerable to rust and honey fungus.
