= List of Hypericum species =

Hypericum
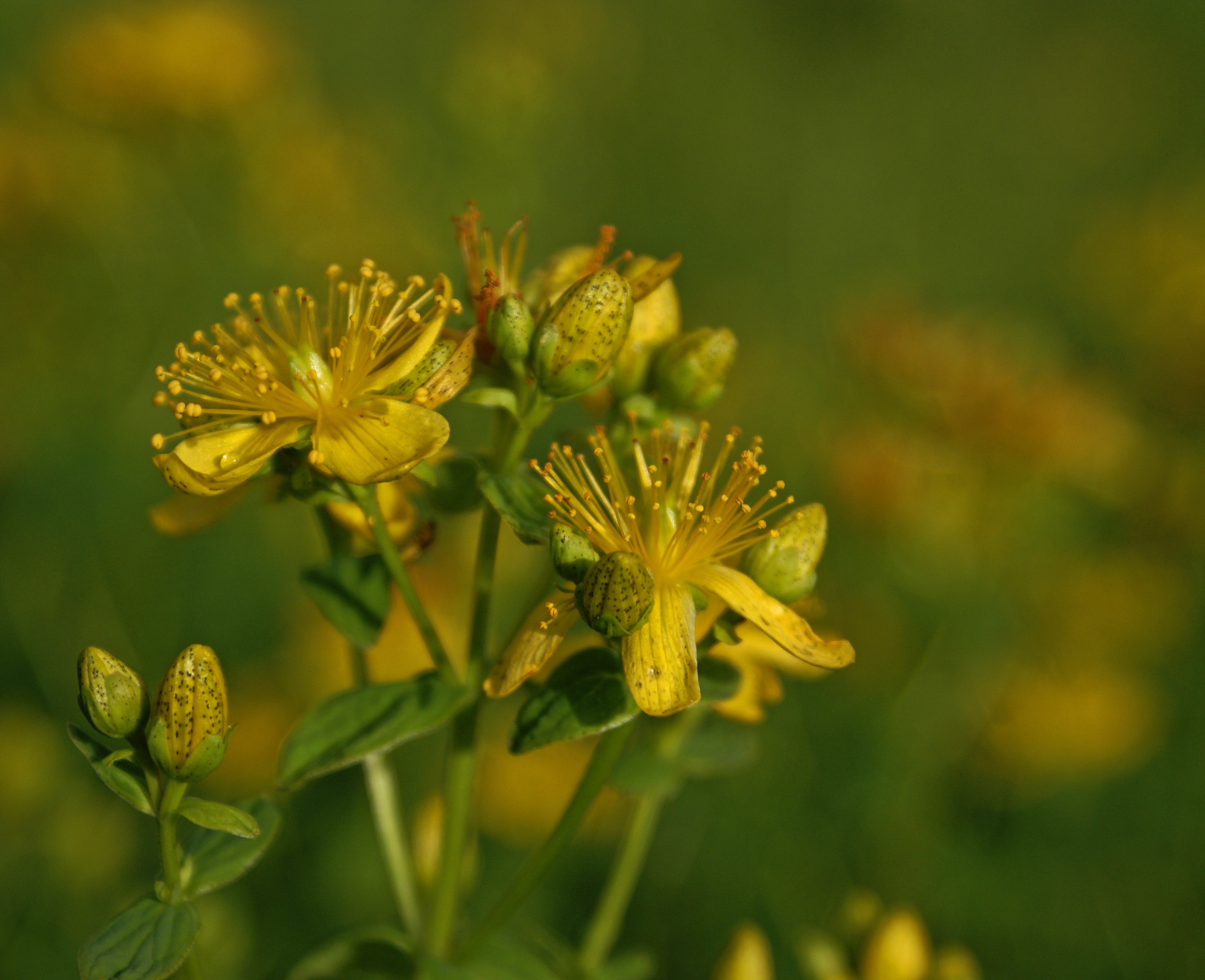
Hypericum perforatum,

the type species of the genus

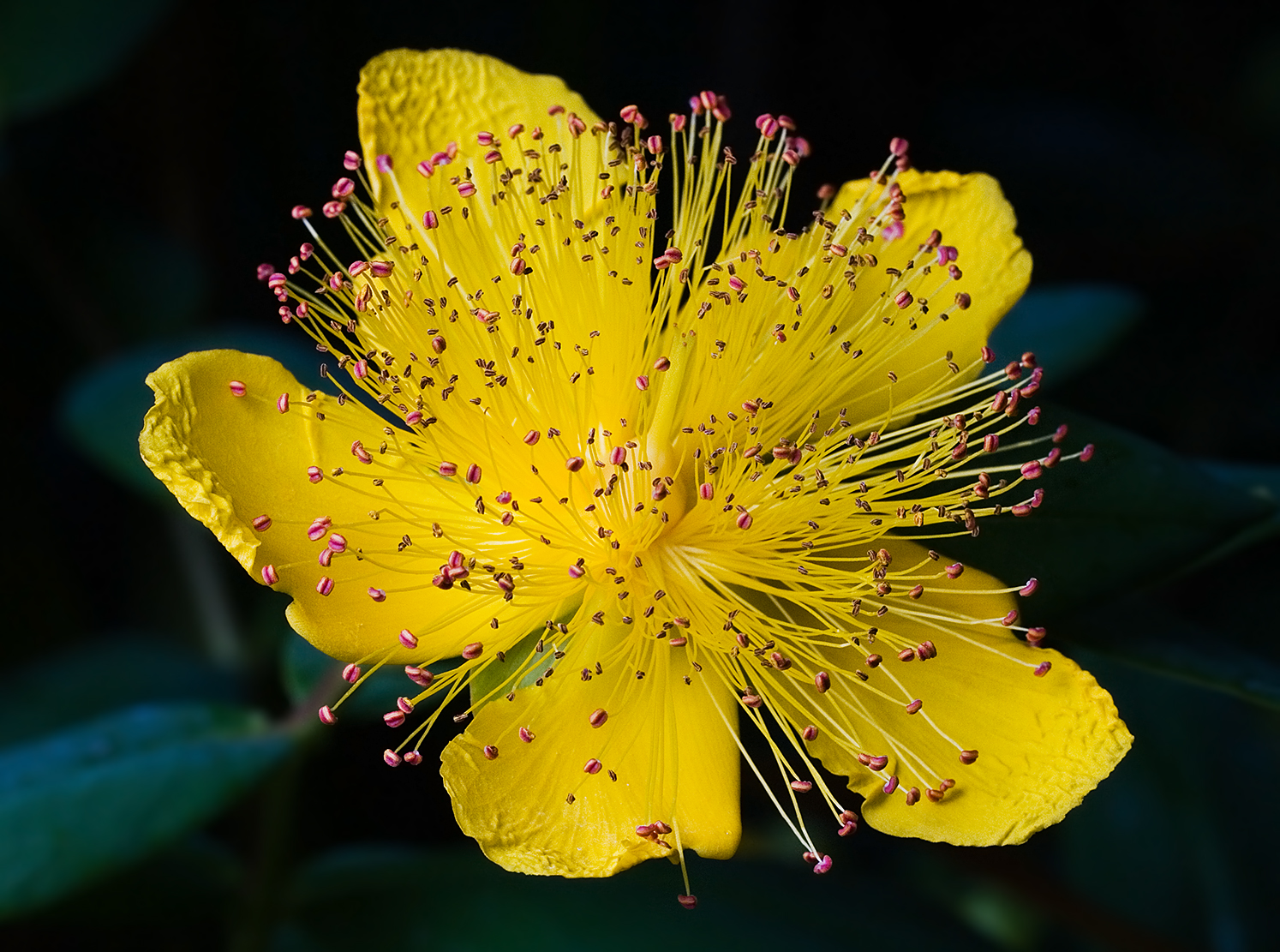
Hypericum calycinum,

an ornamental plant of the genus

Clades
- Clade Euhypericum
  - sect. Adenosepalum
  - sect. Bupleuroides
  - sect. Campylopus
  - sect. Concinna
  - sect. Coridium
  - sect. Crossophyllum
  - sect. Drosocarpium
  - sect. Elodeoida
  - sect. Graveolentia
  - sect. Hirtella
  - sect. Humifusoideum
  - sect. Hypericum
  - sect. Monanthema
  - sect. Oligostema
  - sect. Origanifolia
  - sect. Sampsonia
  - sect. Taeniocarpium
- Clade Brathys s.l.
  - sect. Brathys
  - sect. Trigynobrathys
- Clade Myriandra-Ascyreia s.l.
  - Clade Ascyreia s.l.
    - sect. Ascyreia
    - sect. Campylosporus
    - sect. Psorophytum
    - sect. Takasagoya
  - Clade Myriandra s.l.
    - sect. Androsaemum
    - sect. Myriandra
  - sect. Roscyna
- Mediterranean Grade
  - sect. Adenotrias
  - sect. Arthrophyllum
  - sect. Heterophylla
  - sect. Inodora
  - sect. Triadenoides
  - sect. Umbraculoides
  - sect. Webbia

The genus Hypericum contains approximately 500 species which are divided into 36 sections as described by botanist Norman Robson. This division into distinct sections is largely due to the fact that a genus-wide monograph was performed by Robson in 1977, which allowed for a comprehensive analysis of the genus's taxonomy. A phylogenetic study was more recently completed for the genus, which gave evidence to suggest that the genus Triadenum is a clade within Hypericum and that the genus Thornea is sister to Hypericum. In addition, the study found that about 60% of the sections of Hypericum are monophyletic.

Almost all species of Hypericum are either perennial herbs, shrubs, or small trees, but the genus also contains a small amount of subshrubs and annual herbs. Most of its species contain hypericin or hyperforin and some are used for their healing properties in folk medicine. The species' leaves are always placed opposite, and are normally decussate. Their flowers are generally homostylous, but very few are dimorphically heterostylous. The petals are normally golden yellow or orange, but some are white or cream, and are veined dorsally. They have 4–5 stamen fascicles, 2–5 ovaries, and 2–5 styles. Some species grow capsular fruit which are colored red or blackish.

Hypericum species can be found all over the world in temperate to tropical areas. The genus is most diverse in Turkey (~80 species) and China (~60 species), but can be found across Asia and Europe, in parts of Africa and South America, Australia, and across the United States and southern Canada. Non-native species have also been introduced into various regions of the United States and Argentina. The genus are generally found in dry, desert areas to being in shallow water, and can be found from warm temperate climates to cold temperate climates.

Some Hypericum species are used as ornamental plants because of their large, spreading flowers. These include H. aegypticum, H. androsaemum, H. calycinum, and H. olympicum. In addition, there are a number of hybrids and cultivars that have been developed for use in horticulture. Some notable cultivars are H. × moserianum, H. 'Hidcote', and H. 'Rowallane'. Several species are also used for their medicinal properties, especially their ability to alleviate mild clinical depression, by drawing out the oily extract from the flowers. H. perforatum is the most potent out of all the species, and is the only species cultivated commercially for herbalism and medicine.

== Legend ==
Type species	Type species of section	Type species of genus
Binomial	The binomial name of the Hypericum species.	
Common name	The name that the species is commonly called	
Type	The type of plant that the species is described as	
Distribution	The country or region where the species is most densely found	

== Sect. Adenosepalum ==
Adenosepalum Spach is divided into four subsections: Adenosepalum, Aethiopica, Caprifolia, and the Huber-Morathii Group. These subsections contain eight, seven, eleven, and five species, respectively, giving the section Adenosepalum a total of thirty-one species. In addition, Adenosepalum contains two Nothospecies: H. × joerstadii and H. pubescens × tomentosum. H. annulatum has three distinct subspecies.

Adenosepalum is made up of primarily perennial herbs, and also includes shrubs and shrublets. Its species grow to be approximately 2.5 meters tall, and are generally deciduous. Species in Adenosepalum are glabrous or have simple hairs, and almost always have dark black glands on their leaves, sepals, and rarely on their petals and stems. Their leaves are placed opposite and have no ventral glands. Their flowers are stellate or homostylous. They have 5 sepals, 5 stamen fascicles, and 5 petals.

Binomial	Common name	Type	Distribution	Image	References
Subsection Adenosepalum
H. annulatum Moris (1827)		Perennial herb	Balkans, Saudi Arabia, East Africa		
H. athoum Boiss. & Orph. (1867)		Perennial herb	Greece		
H. atomarium Boiss. (1827)		Perennial herb	Greece, Turkey, Portugal (Naturalized)		
H. cuisinii Barbey (1885)		Perennial herb	Europe		
H. delphicum Boiss. & Heldr. (1854)		Perennial herb	Evvoia and Andros, Greece		
H. lanuginosum Lam. (1797)		Perennial herb	Middle East, Turkey, Cyprus		
H. montanum L. (1755)	Pale St. John's Wort	Perennial herb	Eurasia and Morocco		
H. reflexum L.f. (1782)		Shrub	Canary Islands		
Subsection Aethiopica
H. abilianum N.Robson (1980)		Subshrub	Huíla Province, Angola		
H. aethiopicum Thunb. (1800)		Perennial herb	Southern Africa		
H. afrum Lam. (1797)		Perennial herb	Tunisia, Algeria		
H. conjungens N.Robson (1958)		Shrub/subshrub	Southwest Tanzania to Zambia		
H. glandulosum Aiton (1789)	Malfurada del Monte	Shrub	Canary Islands and Madeira		
H. kiboënse Oliv. (1887)		Shrub/Subshrub	Uganda, Kenya and North Tanzania		
Subsection Caprifolia
H. caprifolium Boiss. (1838)		Perennial herb	Spain		
H. coadunatum Chr. Sm. (1825)		Subshrub/Perennial herb	Canary Islands		
H. collenetteae N.Robson (1993)		Subshrub/Perennial herb	Saudi Arabia		
H. naudinianum Coss. & Durieu (1855)		Perennial herb	Morocco, Algeria		
H. psilophytum (Diels) Maire (1935)		Perennial herb	Morocco, Algeria		
H. pubescens Boiss. (1838)		Perennial herb	Southern Iberia, North Africa		
H. scruglii Bacch., Brullo & Salmeri (2010)		Perennial herb	Sardinia		
H. sinaicum Hochst. ex Boiss. (1867)		Perennial herb	Egypt, Arabian Peninsula		
H. somaliense N.Robson (1958)		Perennial herb	Somalia		
H. tomentosum L. (1753)		Perennial herb	Western Mediterranean		
Huber-Morathii Group
H. decaisneanum Coss. & Daveau (1889)		Perennial herb	Libya		
H. formosissimum Takht. (1940)		Perennial herb	Armenia, Azerbaijan, Turkey		
H. huber-morathii N.Robson (1967)		Perennial herb	Anatolia, Turkey		
H. minutum P.H.Davis & Poulter (1954)		Perennial herb	Mediterranean		
H. sechmenii Ocak & O.Koyuncu (2009)		Perennial herb	Turkey		

== Sect. Adenotrias ==
Adenotrias (Jaub. & Spach) R. Keller contains three species: H. aciferum, H. aegypticum, and H. russeggeri. Its type species is H. russeggeri. It is not divided into any subsections. H. aegypticum has three subspecies: H. aegypticum aegypticum L., H. aegypticum maroccanum (Pau) N.Robson, and H. aegypticum webbii (Spach) N.Robson.

Adenotrias contains shrubs and shrublets. Its species can grow to be up to 2 meters tall. Its species are glabrous, but have no dark glands. Their leaves are lined and glandular, and are cortex green. Their flowers are almost tubular, and are heterostylous. They have 5 sepals, 5 petals, and 3 stamen fascicles.

Binomial	Common name	Type	Distribution	Image	References
H. aciferum (Greuter) N.Robson (1967)		Shrublet	Crete		
H. aegypticum L. (1753)	Egyptian St. John's Wort	Shrub/shrublet	North Africa, Greece, Sardinia		
H. russeggeri (Fenzl) R.Keller		Shrub/shrublet	Turkey, Syria		

== Sect. Androsaemum ==
Androsaemum (Duhamel) Godron contains four species: H. androsaemum, H. foliosum, H. grandifolium, and H. hircinum. In addition, Androsaemum contains one Nothospecies: H. × inodorum. It is not divided into subsections. Its type species is H. androsaemum. One of its species, H. grandifolium, has five different subspecies. The section's species are often collectively referred to as Tutsan.

Androsaemum contains shrubs that grow to be from 0.3–2 meters tall. Its species are deciduous and glabrous, but have no dark glands. Their leaves are opposite, decussate, free, and are a pale color. Every species has 20 flowers, branching out from 2 separate nodes, which are homostylous. They have 5 sepals, 5 petals, and 5 stamen fascicles.

Binomial	Common name	Type	Distribution	Image	References
H. androsaemum L. (1753)	Sweet-Amber	Shrub	Southern Europe, North Africa		
H. foliosum Aiton (1789)	Azorean St. John's Wort	Shrub	Portugal (The Azores)		
H. grandifolium Choisy (1821)	Malfurada	Shrub	Madeira and the Canary Islands		
H. hircinum L. (1753)	Stinking Tutsan	Shrub	France, Iberia, Italy, Middle East, North Africa		

== Sect. Arthrophyllum ==
Arthrophyllum Jaub. & Spach contains five species, and is not divided into any subsections. Its type species is H. rupestre. Arthrophyllum is most closely related to Webbia.

Arthrophyllum contains shrubs that grow to be approximately 0.9 meters tall and are deciduous but never leafless. Species in Arthrophyllum are glabrous, with reddish to dark glands. Their leaves are placed opposite and are either decussate, sessile, free, or perfoliate and have no ventral glands. They are 40-flowered, and their flowers are stellate and homostylous. They have 5 sepals that lack marginal glands. Arthrophyllum's species also have 5 petals and 3 stamen fascicles, each with 20–40 stamens. Their seeds are narrow and cylindrical.

Binomial	Common name	Type	Distribution	Image	References
H. cardiophyllum Boiss. (1867)		Shrub	Turkey, Lebanon and Syria		
H. nanum Poir. (1814)		Shrub	Lebanon, Syria and Israel		
H. pamphylicum N.Robson & P.H.Davis (1980)		Shrub	Turkey		
H. rupestre Jaub. & Spach (1842)		Shrub	Turkey		
H. vacciniifolium Hayek & Siehe (1914)		Shrub	East Cilicia, Southern Turkey		

== Sect. Ascyreia ==
Ascyreia Choisy contains about 50 species and also includes four nothospecies. The section is one of the largest in the genus that is not divided into any subsections. Its type species is H. calycinum. The section is synonymous with Norysca Spach..

Ascyreia is made up of mostly shrubs or shrublets, but also contains a few trees. Its species generally grow to be from 4–5 meters tall. Some of the species are evergreen, but most are deciduous. They are glabrous, and lack dark glands. Their leaves are opposite, decussate, and free. The section's species have anywhere from 1–25 flowers, which are stellate and homostylous. They have five sepals, which are free. They also have five petals and five stamen fascicles, which each have 20–100 stamens. Their seeds are cylindric or ellipsoid, and some are laterally winged.

Binomial	Common name	Type	Distribution	Image	References
H. acmosepalum N.Robson (1970)		Shrub	China		
H. addingtonii N.Robson (1985)	Addington's St. John's Wort	Shrub	China		
H. augustinii N.Robson (1970)	Augustine's St. John's Wort	Shrub	China		
H. beanii N.Robson (1970)		Shrub	China		
H. bellum H.L.Li (1944)		Shrub	China		
H. calycinum L. (1767)	Great St. John's Wort Aaron's Beard Rose of Sharon	Shrub	Bulgaria, Turkey		
H. choisianum Wall. ex N.Robson (1973)		Shrub	China, India, Pakistan		
H. cohaerens N.Robson (1985)		Shrub	China		
H. cordifolium Choisy (1824)		Shrub	Nepal		
H. curvisepalum N.Robson (1985)		Shrub	China		
H. elatoides R.Keller (1904)		subshrub	China		
H. forrestii (Chitt.) N.Robson (1970)	Forest Tutsan	Shrub	China, Burma		
H. gaitii Haines (1919)		Shrub	India		
H. gracilipes Stapf ex C.E.C.Fisch. (1940)		Shrub	India, Bangladesh		
H. griffithii Hook.f. & Thomson ex Dyer (1874)		Shrub	Bhutan, India		
H. henryi H.Lév. & Vaniot (1908)		Shrub	China, Southeast Asia		
H. hookerianum Wight & Arn. (1834)	Hooker's St. John's Wort	Shrub	East and South Asia		
H. kouytchense H.Lév. (1904)		Shrub	China		
H. lacei N.Robson (1985)		Shrub	Myanmar		
H. lagarocladum N.Robson (1985)		Shrub	China		
H. lancasteri N.Robson (1985)		Shrub	China		
H. leschenaultii Choisy (1824)		Shrub/small tree	Indonesia		
H. lobbii N.Robson (1970)		Shrub	India		
H. longistylum Oliv.			China		
H. maclarenii N.Robson (1985)		Shrub	China		
H. monogynum L. (1763)		Shrub	China (Southeast), Taiwan		
H. mysurense Wall. ex Wight & Arn. (1934)		Shrub	India (South), Sri Lanka		
H. oblongifolium Choisy (1821)	Pendant St. John's Wort	Shrub	Pakistan, India, Nepal		
H. oxyphyllum N.Robson (2012)		Shrub	Sichuan		
H. pachyphyllum Collett & Hemsl. (1890)		Shrub/undershrub	Myanmar		
H. patulum Thunb. (1784)	Goldencup St. John's Wort Yellow Mosqueta	Shrub	China		
H. podocarpoides N.Robson (1977)		Shrub	Nepal, India		
H. prattii Hemsl. (1892)		Shrub	China		
H. pseudohenryi N.Robson (1970)	Irish Tutsan	Shrub	China		
H. reptans Hook.f. & Thomson ex Dyer (1874)		Shrublet	China, Burma, India, Nepal		
H. sherriffii N.Robson & D.G.Long (1983)		Shrub	Bhutan		
H. siamense N.Robson (1985)		Shrub	Thailand		
H. stellatum N.Robson (1970)		Shrub	China		
H. subsessile N.Robson (1985)		Shrub	China		
H. tenuicaule Hook.f. & Thomson ex Dyer (1874)		Shrub	Bhutan, India, Nepal		
H. uralum Buch.-Ham. ex D.Don (1823)		Shrub	China, Burma, India		
H. wardianum N.Robson (2005)		Shrub	China, Burma		
H. williamsii N.Robson (1977)		Shrub	Nepal		
H. wilsonii N.Robson (1970)		Shrub	China		

== Sect. Brathys ==
Brathys (Mutis ex L.f.) Choisy is the largest section in Hypericum. It is divided into four subsections: Brathys, Phellotes, Spachium, and Styphelioides. Brathys contains 38 species and the type species, H. juniperinum. Phellotes contains 32 species, Spachium contains 14 species, and Styphelioides contains just 2 species. In total, the section contains 86 species.

Brathys contains a wide variety of plants, including small trees, shrubs, shrublets, and herbs. The largest species in the section grow to be 6 meters tall, and are evergreen. Its species are glabrous—though a few have simple hairs—and lack any dark glands. Their stems are either 4 or 6–lined, and are compressed when the plant is young, but later become terete. Their leaves are placed opposite, are decussate and sessile, and have dense marginal glands. All the species have either one flower on the uppermost node of the plant or 2–15 flowers branching from the uppermost node and from lower secondary nodes. The flowers are stellate or sometimes obconic, and are homostylous. The species have 5 petals which are persistent. They have 5 stamen fascicles which contain anywhere from 1–50 stamens each, formed in a tight ring, to give the plants a total of anywhere from 5–250 stamens. The plants have 5 ovaries, 5 sepals, and 3–5 styles.

Binomial	Common name	Type	Distribution	Image	References
Subsection Brathys
H. aciculare Kunth (1821)		Shrub	Peru, Ecuador		
H. andinum Gleason (1929)		Shrub/shrublet	Bolivia, Peru		
H. baccharoides Cuatrec. (1959)		Shrub	Colombia, Venezuela		
H. bolivaricum N. Robson (1987)		Shrub	Colombia		
H. bryoides Gleason (1929)		Subshrub	Colombia		
H. caracasanum Willd.		Shrub/shrublet	Venezuela		
H. cardonae Cuatrec.		Shrub/shrublet	Costa Rica, Venezuela, Colombia		
H. cassiopiforme N. Robson		Shrub	Peru		
H. costaricense N. Robson	Costa Rica St. John's Wort	Shrub/shrublet	Colombia, Costa Rica		
H. decandrum Turcz.		Shrub/shrublet	Ecuador, Peru		
H. harlingii N. Robson		Shrub	Ecuador		
H. horizontale N. Robson		Shrublet	Colombia		
H. jaramilloi N. Robson		Shrub	Costa Rica, Colombia		
H. juniperinum Kunth		Shrub/shrublet	Colombia, Venezuela		
H. lancifolium Gleason		Shrub	Colombia, Venezuela		
H. lancioides Cuatrec.		Shrub	Colombia, Ecuador, Venezuela		
H. llanganaticum N. Robson		Shrub	Ecuador		
H. magdalenicum N. Robson		Shrub/small tree	Colombia, Venezuela		
H. magniflorum Cuatrec.		Shrub	Colombia, Venezuela		
H. marahuacanum N. Robson		Shrub	Colombia, Venezuela		
H. mexicanum L.		Shrub/shrublet	Colombia, Venezuela		
H. millefolium Urb. & Ekman		Shrub	Haiti		
H. parallelum N. Robson		Shrub	Colombia		
H. pimeleoides Planch. & Linden ex Triana & Planch.		Shrub	Colombia		
H. prietoi N. Robson (1945)		Shrub	Ecuador		
H. prostratum Cuatrec.		Shrub/Shrublet	Colombia		
H. pycnophyllum Urb.		Shrub	Dominican Republic		
H. recurvum N. Robson		Shrub	Peru		
H. ruscoides Cuatrec.		Shrub	Colombia, Ecuador		
H. selaginella N. Robson		Shrublet	Colombia		
H. sprucei N. Robson		Shrub	Ecuador		
H. strictum Kunth		Shrub	Colombia		
H. struthiolifolium Juss.		Shrub	Peru		
H. stuebelii Hieron.		Shrub	South America		
H. tetrastichum Cuatrec.		Shrub/shrublet	Colombia		
H. valleanum N. Robson		Shrub	Colombia		
H. wurdackii N. Robson		Shrub	Peru		
Subsection Phellotes
H. acostanum Steyerm. ex N. Robson		Shrub	Ecuador		
H. asplundii N. Robson		Shrublet	Ecuador		
H. callacallanum N. Robson		Shrub	Peru		
H. carinosum R. Keller		Shrub	Colombia, Venezuela		
H. castellanoi N. Robson		Shrub/shrublet	Colombia, Venezuela		
H. cuatrecasii Gleason		Shrub	Colombia		
H. espinalii N. Robson		Shrub	Colombia		
H. garciae Pierce		Shrub	Colombia, Venezuela		
H. gladiatum N. Robson		Shrub	Colombia		
H. goyanesii Cuatrec.		Shrub	Colombia		
H. hartwegii Benth. (1843)		Shrub	Ecuador		
H. humboldtianum Steud. (1840)		Shrub/shrublet	Colombia, Venezuela		
H. irazuense Kuntze ex N. Robson		Shrub/small tree	Costa Rica, Panama		
H. laricifolium Juss.		Shrub/small tree	Colombia, Ecuador, Peru, Venezuela		
H. loxense Benth.		Shrub/shrublet	Ecuador, Peru		
H. lycopodioides Triana & Planch.		Shrub	Colombia		
H. maguirei N. Robson		Shrub	Ecuador		
H. martense N. Robson		Shrublet	Colombia		
H. matangense N. Robson (1990)		Shrub	Ecuador		
H. myricariifolium Hieron.		Shrub	Colombia		
H. papillosum N. Robson		Shrub	Colombia		
H. paramitanum N. Robson		Shrub/small tree	Venezuela		
H. phellos Gleason (1929)		Shrub/small tree	Colombia, Venezuela		
H. piriai Arechav.	Atlantic St. John's Wort	Shrub/perennial herb	Brazil, Uruguay		
H. quitense R.Keller		Shrub/shrublet	Ecuador		
H. radicans N. Robson		Shrublet	Colombia		
H. roraimense Gleason		Shrub	Venezuela		
H. sabiniforme Trevis.		Shrub	Colombia		
H. simonsii N. Robson		Shrub (?)	Colombia		
H. stenopetalum Turcz.		Shrub/small tree	Colombia, Venezuela		
H. thuyoides Kunth		Shrub/small tree	Colombia		
H. woodianum N. Robson		Shrub	Colombia		
Subsection Spachium
H. arbuscula Standl. & Steyerm.		Subshrub/shrublet	Mexico, Guatemala		
H. beamanii N. Robson		Shrublet	Guatemala		
H. chamaemyrtus Triana & Planch.		Subshrub	Colombia, Venezuela		
H. cymobrathys N. Robson		Shrub	Colombia		
H. dichotomum Lam.		Perennial herb	Dominican Republic, Haiti		
H. diosmoides Griseb.	Puerto Rico St. John's Wort	Perennial herb	Caribbean		
H. drummondii (Grev. & Hook.) Torr. & A. Gray	Drummond's St. John's Wort Nits and Lice	Annual herb	United States		
H. eastwoodianum I.M.Johnst.	Eastwood's St. John's Wort	Subshrub/shrublet	Mexico		
H. fuertesii Urb.		Shrublet/perennial herb	Dominican Republic, Haiti		
H. galinum S.F. Blake		Shrublet	Mexico		
H. gentianoides (L.) Britton, Sterns & Poggenb.	Pineweed Orangegrass	Annual herb	Canada, United States, South America		
H. gnidioides Seem.		Subshrub/shrublet	Costa Rica, Honduras, Panama		
H. peninsulare Eastw.		Subshrub/perennial herb	Mexico		
H. rubritinctum N. Robson		Shrublet	Mexico	N. Robson[34]	
Subsection Styphelioides
H. styphelioides A.Rich.		Shrub	Cuba		
H. terrae-firmae Sprague & L.Riley		Shrub/small tree	Belize		

== Sect. Bupleuroides ==
Bupleuroides Stef. contains one species, H. bupleuroides, which shares the name of the section.

H. bupleuroides is a perennial herb that grows to be approximately 75 centimeters tall. The species' stems sprout from branching rhizomes, and are glabrous and lack dark glands. The leaves are placed opposite and are terete and are perfoliate. It has anywhere from 4–25 flowers that branch from 1–5 nodes and are stellate and homostylous and have 5 petals. There are either 3 or 4 stamen fascicles with 20–25 stamens each. The species has 5 sepals, 3 ovaries, and 3 styles.

Binomial	Common name	Type	Distribution	Image	References
H. bupleuroides Stef. (1852)		Perennial herb	Turkey, Russia		

== Sect. Campylopus ==
Campylopus Boiss. contains one species, H. cerastioides, which is also frequently called H. campylopus. This species is widely cultivated for its vibrant flowers. The section is most closely related to Olympia and Oligostema which are its sister taxa.

Hypericum cerastioides is a perennial herb that grows to be 6–25 centimeters tall, and normally grows upright but sometimes grows prostrate along the ground. It can have a few or numerous stems from plant to plant, and is normally unbranched or branched only below the inflorescence. The stems are white and pubescent with 5–35 millimeter long internodes that can be either shorter or longer than the leaves. It is 1–5 flowered with flowers 2–5 centimeters in diameter. The petals are golden yellow without a tint of red and number 2 times the number of sepals in the inflorescence, and there are 60–100 stamens.

Binomial	Common name	Type	Distribution	Image	References
H. cerastioides N.Robson (1967)		Subshrub/Perennial herb	Bulgaria, Greece and Turkey		

== Sect. Camplyosporus ==
Campylosporus (Spach) R. Keller contains ten species from Africa and the Middle East. Its type species is H. lanceolatum.

The section contains primarily shrubs and trees that can be spreading or grow up to twelve meters tall. They are all evergreen and may or may not have dark glands along the branches. Most species have bark which is fissured and scaly. The species have many flowers which are homostylous. They have five sepals, five petals, and five stamen fascicles which each have 20–45 stamens.

Binomial	Common name	Type	Distribution	Image	References
H. balfourii N.Robson		Shrub/tree	Socotra		
H. bequaertii De Wild.		Shrub/tree	Kenya, Uganda, Zaïre		
H. gnidiifolium A.Rich.		Shrub/tree	Ethiopia		
H. lanceolatum Lam.		Shrub/small tree	Comoros, Réunion		
H. madagascariense (Spach) Steud.	Madagascar St. John's Wort	Shrub	Madagascar		
H. quartinianum A.Rich.		Shrub/tree	Ethiopia, Kenya, Malawi, Mozambique, Sudan, Tanzania, Uganda, Yemen, Zambia, Zaïre		
H. revolutum Vahl	Curry Bush	Shrub/tree	Middle East, Ethiopia, Cameroon		
H. roeperianum Schimp. ex A.Rich.	Large-leaved Curry Bush	Shrub/tree	Limpopo, South Africa		
H. socotranum R.D.Good	Socotra St. John's Wort	Shrub	Socotra		
H. synstylum N.Robson		Shrub	Ethiopia, Somalia		

== Sect. Concinna ==
Concinna N.Robson contains one species, H. concinnum, which is commonly known as Goldwire.

H. concinnum is a perennial herb or infrequently a subshrub that grows up to 45 centimeters tall. Its stems are erect or ascend from taproots and have dark glands, and change from 4-lined to 2-lined as the species grows. The leaves are placed opposite, and are decussate and free, with closed lamina. The species is 17-flowered and the flowers are stellate and homostylous, with five petals each. The species has five stamen fascicles and a total of 40–100 stamens.

Binomial	Common name	Type	Distribution	Image	References
H. concinnum Benth. (1849)	Goldwire	Perennial herb/subshrub	California		

== Sect. Coridium ==
Coridium Spach contains six species from with distributions across Europe. Its type species is H. coris.

The species in the section are low dwarf shrubs or perennial herbs that grow up to 60 centimeters tall. The leaves are glabrous or paperlike, with stems that branch from the taproot and that have dark red and black glands. The leaves are three or four-whorled and have one vein. The species have one to many flowers that come from one to six nodes and are stellate and homostylous. They have five sepals, five petals, and three stamen fascicles with a total of 25–60 stamens.

Binomial	Common name	Type	Distribution	Image	References
H. amblyocalyx Coustur. & Gand (1917)		Dwarf shrub	Crete		
H. asperuloides Czern. ex Turcz. (1858)		Perennial herb	Russia		
H. coris L. (1753)	Heath-leaved St. John's Wort	Low shrub	Switzerland and north-western Italy		
H. empetrifolium Willd. (1803)		Subshrub	Albania, Greece, Crete, East Aegean Islands, Turkey, Libya		
H. ericoides L. (1753)		Dwarf shrub	Spain, Tunisia, Morocco		
H. jovis Greuter (1975)		Dwarf shrub	Crete		

== Sect. Crossophyllum ==
Crossophyllum Spach contains 4 species of perennial herbs. Its type species is H. orientale. The other species in the section are H. adenotrichum, H. aucheri, and H. thasium.

Species in Crossophyllum grow to be around 55 centimeters tall. They are glabrous, and their stems are erect from a rooting base. Their flowers also branch from the base and sometimes from intermediate nodes. The species have anywhere from 1 to 50 flowers which are stellate and homostylous. Their stems are narrow and eglandular and have dark black or amber glands on raised lines. The leaves are placed opposite and are free and decussate. The species have 5 sepals, 5 petals, and 3 or 5 stamen fascicles with 10–20 stamens each.

Binomial	Common name	Type	Distribution	Image	References
H. adenotrichum Spach (1826)	Kantaron	Perennial herb	Turkey		
H. aucheri Jaub. & Spach (1842)		Perennial herb	Bulgaria, Greece, Turkey		
H. orientale L. (1753)		Perennial herb	Georgia, Turkey, Russia		
H. thasium Griesb. (1843)		Perennial herb	Bulgaria, Greece, Turkey		

== Sect. Drosocarpium ==
Drosocarpium Spach contains small perennial herbs that are found around the Mediterranean. H. richeri has 3 subspecies.

The species in the section grow up to 80 centimeters tall and are glabrous (except H. rochelii). Their leaves are placed opposite and are decussate and free. The species have anywhere between one and seventy flowers branching from one to three nodes which are stellate and homostylous. The species has five petals that are persistent after flowering and erect but not twisting, three or four stamen fascicles with a total of thirty to eighty stamens, and three to four styles.

Binomial	Common name	Type	Distribution	Image	References
H. ambiguum Elliott (1821)					
H. barbatum Jacq. (1775)	Bearded St. John's Wort	Perennial herb	Austria, Italy, Balkans		
H. bithynicum Boiss. (1849)		Perennial herb	Georgia, Turkey (Northern)	On stones in Giresun, Turkey	
H. confusum Rose (1906)					
H. montbretii Spach (1836)		Perennial herb	Balkans, Turkey, Syria, Lebanon, Russia		
H. perfoliatum L. (1767)		Perennial herb	Iberia, North Africa, France, Italy, Greece, Turkey		
H. richeri Vill. (1779)	Alpine St. John's Wort	Perennial herb	Balkans, Switzerland (Alps), Spain (Pyrenees)	''H. richeri'' subsp. ''burseri'' in the Pyrenees Mountains	
H. rochelii Griseb. & Schenk (1852)		Perennial herb	Balkans		
H. rumeliacum Boiss. (1849)		Perennial herb	Balkans	Botanical specimen in the Botanischer Garten, Frankfurt	
H. spruneri Boiss. (1849)		Perennial herb			
H. trichocaulon Boiss. & Heldr. (1849)		Perennial herb			
H. umbellatum A. Kern. (1863)		Perennial herb	Balkans		
H. vesiculosum Griesb. (1843)		Perennial herb	Greece, Turkey		

== Sect. Elodeoida ==
Elodeoida N.Robson contains tall species of annual and perennial herbs. Its type species is H. elodeoides.

The species in the section grow to be up to one meter tall. Their stems are erect or lie flat, sometimes branch out at the base, and are terete. The leaves have dark glands on them and are placed opposite, are decussate, and grow about a centimeter long. The species can have up to fifty flowers, which are homostylous and stellate. They have five petal that remain after flowering and are erect. There are five stamen fascicles are there are a total of nine to sixty stamens with dark anther glands. The seeds are cylindric.

Binomial	Common name	Type	Distribution	Image	References
H. austroyunnanicum L.H. Wu & D.P. Yang (2002)	Minnan St. John's Wort	Perennial herb			
H. elodeoides Choisy (1824)	Straight-stemmed St. John's Wort	Perennial herb	China, Myanmar, India, Bhutan, Nepal		
H. hubeiense L.H. Wu & D.P. Yang (2004)		Perennial herb			
H. kingdonii N.Robson (2001)		Perennial herb	China, Myanmar, India		
H. petiolulatum Hook.f. & Thomson ex Dyer (1874)		Perennial herb/annual herb	China, India, Southeast Asia		
H. qinlingense X.C.Du & Y.Ren (2005)		Perennial herb			
H. seniawinii Maxim. (1881)		Perennial herb			

== Sect. Graveolentia ==
Graveolentia N.Robson is a diverse section of nine species whose type species is H. graveolens.

Graveolentia is similar to sect. Hypericum but differs in having mature stem internodes with different characteristics, as well as sepals with linear laminar glands and amber anther glands. Species in the section have one to seventy flowers regularly, but can have up to 124 in some circumstances, and they grow from one to four different nodes. The species have five sepals that are free and persistent and stand erect when the plants are in fruit. They also have five petals that are erect and not twisting and lack apiculus. There are also five stamen fascicles with a total of sixteen to ninety stamens.

Binomial	Common name	Type	Distribution	Image	References
H. collinum Schltdl. & Cham. (1830)		Wiry perennial herb	Mexico		
H. epigeium R.Keller (1908)		Wiry perennial herb	Mexico, Guatemala		
H. formosum Kunth (1822)	Western St. John's Wort	Perennial herb	Mexico		
H. graveolens Buckley (1843)	Mountain St. John's Wort	Perennial herb		Photo near Clingmans Dome	
H. macvaughii N.Robson (2006)		Perennial herb	Mexico		
H. oaxacanum R.Keller (1923)		Wiry perennial herb/subshrub	Guatemala, Mexico		
H. pringlei S.Watson (1890)		Perennial herb	Mexico		
H. pseudomaculatum Bush (1901)	False Spotted St. John's Wort	Perennial herb			
H. punctatum Lam. (1796)	Spotted St. John's Wort	Perennial herb	Canada, United States		

== Sect. Heterophylla ==
Heterophylla N.Robson contains a single shrublet, H. heterophyllum, from which the section derives its name.

H. heterophyllum is a shrublet that grows to be up to 25 centimeters tall. It is semi-deciduous and glabrous and lacks dark glands. The stems are 2-lined and are colored cortex green, but their bark is smooth and reddish brown. The leaves are placed opposite and are decussate, sessile, and free. The leaf blades are open or 1-nerved and their glands are linear to punctiform and are dense in the margins but the ventral glands are absent. They have 3-12 flowers that branch from 1–3 nodes and sometimes the lower branches will flower as well., and the flowers are stellate and homostylous. There are five sepals, three styles, and three stamen fascicles with a total of 35–45 stamens.

Binomial	Common name	Type	Distribution	Image	References
H. heterophyllum Vent. (1802)		Shrublet			

== Sect. Hirtella ==
Hirtella Stef., not to be confused with the unrelated genus Hirtella described by Linnaeus, is split into two subsections: subsect. Platyadenum and subsect. Stenadum, which have eighteen and eleven species respectively for a total of twenty nine species.

The section contains perennial herbs that grow up to eighty centimeters tall. They are often glaucous and the stems are erect or decumbent, and are rarely rooting (H. hyssopifolium). The stems are 2-lined and usually glandiferous. The leaves are placed opposite, are decussate, sessile, and are usually free. The leaf blades have pale glands but lack ventral glands. The species have few to many flowers that grow from five to fifteen nodes, and sometimes have flowering branches from lower nodes. Their flowers are stellate and homostylous. They have five sepals, five petals that are sometimes tinged red, and around three stamen fascicles with a total of 25–60 stamens. The seeds are cylindrical in shape.

Binomial	Common name	Type	Distribution	Image	References
Subsection Platyadenum
H. amblysepalum Hochst. (1845)		Perennial herb	Israel, Lebanon, Syria, Turkey, Iraq, Iran		
H. asperulum Jaub. & Spach (1842)		Perennial herb	Iraq		
H. capitatum Choisy (1821)		Perennial herb	Syria, Turkey		
H. hedgei N.Robson (2010)		Perennial herb			
H. helianthemoides (Spach) Boiss. (1849)		Perennial herb	Turkey, Azerbaijan, Iran, Turkmenistan		
H. hirtellum (Spach) Boiss. (1849)		Perennial herb	Iran, Iraq		
H. libanoticum N.Robson (1970)		Perennial herb			
H. lydium Boiss.		Perennial herb			
H. lysimachioides Boiss. & Noë (1854)		Perennial herb	Turkey, Iraq, Iran		
H. olivieri (Spach) Boiss. (1867)		Perennial herb	Jordan, Syria, Turkey, Iraq, Iran?		
H. pseudolaeve N.Robson (1967)		Perennial herb	Turkey, Georgia, Armenia, Azerbaijan		
H. retusum Aucher ex Jaub. & Spach (1842)		Perennial herb	Syria, Turkey, Iraq		
H. scabroides N.Robson & Poulter (1967)		Perennial herb	Turkey		
H. scabrum L. (1755)		Perennial herb	Middle East, Caucasus, Central Asia, China		
H. spectabile Jaub. & Spach (1842)		Perennial herb	Turkey, Syria		
H. thymbrifolium Boiss. & Noë (1854)		Perennial herb	Turkey		
H. thymopsis Boiss. (1854)		Perennial herb	Turkey		
H. vermiculare Boiss. & Hausskn. (1888)		Perennial herb	Iraq, Iran		
Subsection Stenadenum
H. apiculatum (N.Robson) Sennikov (1993)		Perennial herb	Turkey, Transcaucasia, Iran, Central Asia		
H. apricum Kar. & Kir. (1842)		Perennial herb	Central Asia		
H. callithyrsum Coss. (1852)		Perennial herb	Spain, Morocco		
H. davisii N.Robson		Perennial herb	Turkey, Armenia, Iran		
H. elongatum Ledeb. ex Rchb. (1825)		Perennial herb	Turkey, Transcaucasia, Iran, Central Asia, China		
H. hyssopifolium Chaix (1786)		Perennial herb	Spain, France, Italy, Serbia, Bulgaria		
H. karjaginii Rzazade (1954)		Perennial herb	Turkey, Armenia, Azerbaijan, Iran		
H. microcalycinum Boiss. & Heldr. (1849)		Perennial herb	Turkey (Antalya, Konya, Isparta, Adana, Hatay)		
H. salsolifolium Hand.-Mazz. (1913)		Perennial herb	Turkey		
H. sorgerae N.Robson (1986)		Perennial herb	Turkey		
H. tymphresteum Boiss. & Spruner (1843)		Perennial herb			

== Sect. Humifusoideum ==
Humifusoideum R. Keller, also called Pulogensia, contains 6 species. Its type species is H. peplidifolium. H. beccarii has two subspecies: H. beccarii beccarii and H. beccarii steenisii.

Sect. Humifusoideum contains shrubs, subshrubs, and herbs that grow erect or prostrate and grow up to 1.5 meters tall. The shrubs are evergreen and glabrous and usually have dark glands. The stems are either 2-lined or 4-lined and are flattened when the plant is young, they usually lack glands, but rarely have dark glands; they are colored cortex greed or a dark red, while the bark is smooth and colored red-brown. The leaves are placed opposite, are decussate and free, and their blades are entire and either closed or open, with pale glands. The species usually have one flower, but very rarely can have up to ten that come from two nodes. The flowers are stellate and homostylous and have five free sepals that are persistent, five petals that are persistent and spreading, and three to five stamen fascicles with anywhere from ten to eighty stamens. The seeds are cylindric.

Binomial	Common name	Type	Distribution	Image	References
H. beccarii N.Robson (1973)	Beccari's St. John's Wort	Perennial/annual herb	Indonesia (Sumatra, Java)		
H. nagasawae Hayata (1973)		Perennial herb/shrublet			
H. natalense J.M. Wood & M.S. Evans		Perennial herb	South Africa, Eswatini		
H. nokoense Ohwi (1937)		Perennial herb			
H. peplidifolium A.Rich (1847)		Perennial herb	Sub-saharan Africa		
H. wilmsii R.Keller (1908)		Perennial herb	Zimbabwe, South Africa, Madagascar		

== Sect. Hypericum ==
Hypericum, sometimes referred to as the "type section" of the genus, contains perennial herbs and very few subshrubs. It contains the type species of the genus, H. perforatum. Subsect. Erecta, with twenty-three species, is the far less studied subsection of the section, while the details of subsect. Hypericum have been much more analyzed. Subsect. Hypericum has eighteen species total, with ten (including the type species) in ser. Hypericum, and eight in ser. Senanensia. The section contains forty-one species in total.

The species in sect. Hypericum grow to be 1.2 meters tall and can grow either erect or prostrate. They are glabrous some have dark glands while others do not. Their stems are 2-lined or 2-winged when young and either remain so or become terete as the plant ages. The leaves are placed opposite or abnormally whorled, are decussate, and are either sessile or pseudopetiolate, as well as being free and persistent. They are up to 70-flowered from one to four nodes, with some lower subsidiary branches. The flowers are stellate and homostylous. The species have 5 persistent sepals, 3 stamen fascicles, and 20–100 total stamens.

Binomial	Common name	Type	Distribution	Image	References
Subsection Erecta
H. asahinae Makino		Perennial herb	Japan		
H. elegans Stephan ex Willd.	Elegant St. John's Wort	Perennial herb	Russia, Germany, Eastern Europe, Balkans		
H. erectum Thunb.		Perennial herb	Russia, Korea, Japan, Taiwan, China		
H. furusei N.Robson		Perennial herb	Japan		
H. gracillimum Koidz.		Perennial herb	Japan		
H. hachijyoense Nakai		Perennial herb	Japan (Honshū)		
H. hakonense Franch. & Sav.		Perennial herb	Japan		
H. kawaranum N.Robson		Perennial herb	Japan (Hokkaidō)		
H. kinashianum Koidz.		Perennial herb	Japan (Honshū, Kyūshū)		
H. kitamense (Y.Kimura) N.Robson		Perennial herb	Japan (Hokkaidō)		
H. kiusianum Koidz.		Perennial herb	Japan (Honshū, Kyūshū, Ryūkyū Islands)		
H. kurodakeanum N.Robson		Perennial herb	Japan		
H. nikkoense Makino		Perennial herb	Japan		
H. nuporoense N.Robson		Perennial herb	Japan (Hokkaidō)		
H. ovalifolium Koidz.		Perennial herb	Japan		
H. pseudoerectum N.Robson		Perennial herb	Japan (Hokkaidō)		
H. pseudopetiolatum R.Keller		Perennial herb	Japan		
H. taihezanense Sasaki ex S.Suzuki		Perennial herb	Taiwan, China, Philippines, Malaysia, Indonesia		
H. uniglandulosum Hausskn. ex Bornm.		Perennial herb			
H. vulcanicum Koidz.		Perennial herb	Japan		
H. watanabei N.Robson		Perennial herb	Japan		
H. yamamotoanum H.Koidz.		Perennial herb	Japan (Hokkaidō)		
H. yamamotoi Miyabe & Kimura		Perennial herb	Japan (Hokkaidō)		
Subsection Hypericum
Series Hypericum
H. attenuatum Fisch. ex Choisy (1821)		Perennial herb	Russia, China, Mongolia, Korea		
H. iwate-littorale H.Koidz. (1937)		Perennial herb	Japan (Honshû, Iwate)		
H. maculatum Crantz (1763)	Imperforate St. John's Wort	Perennial herb	Europe, Canada (Introduced)		
H. momoseanum Makino (1931)		Perennial herb	Japan (Honshû)		
H. perforatum L. (1753)	Common St. John's Wort Perforate St. John's Wort Klamath weed	Perennial herb		Plant in [[Gironde, France]]	
H. scouleri Hook. (1831)	Scouler's St. John's Wort	Perennial herb	Canada, United States, Mexico		
H. tetrapterum Fr. (1828)	Slender St. John's Wort	Perennial herb			
H. triquetrifolium Turra (1765)	Wavy-leaved St. John's Wort Curled-leaved St. John's Wort	Perennial herb			
H. undulatum Schousb. ex Willd. (1809)	Flax-Leaved St. John's Wort	Perennial herb	British Isles, France (Brittany), Iberia, North Africa		
H. yezoënse Maxim. (1887)		Perennial herb			
Series Senanensia
H. enshiense L.H. Wu & F.S. Wang (2004)		Perennial herb	China (Hubei)		
H. faberi R.Keller (1925)		Perennial herb	China		
H. kamtschaticum Ledeb. (1841)		Perennial herb	Russia, Japan		
H. nakaii H.Koidz. (1937)		Perennial herb	Japan (Hokkaido)		
H. oliganthum Franch. & Sav. (1878)		Perennial herb	Korea, Japan		
H. pibairense (Miyabe & Y.Kimura) N.Robson (2006)		Perennial herb	Japan (Hokkaido)		
H. senanense Maxim. (1887)		Perennial herb			
H. sikokumontanum Makino (1898)		Perennial herb	Japan (Shikoku, Kyūshū)		

== Sect. Inodora ==
Inodora Stef. contains one species, a shrub called H. xylosteifolium or sometimes H. inodorum.

H. xylosteifolium grows to be approximately 1.5 meters, and is a deciduous plant. It typically has anywhere from 1–7 flowers, which are terminal and sometimes have subsidiary branches. The flowers are 1.5–3 cm in diameter and are stellate and rounded. Its anthers are yellow-orange and its stamen are in fascicles in groups of 10–11.

Binomial	Common name	Type	Distribution	Image	References
H. xylosteifolium (Spach) N.Robson (1967)	Turkish Tutsan	Shrub			

== Sect. Monanthema ==
Monanthema N.Robson contains 7 species native to eastern Asia. One of its species, H. monanthemum, has two subspecies: H. monanthemum filicaule and H. monanthemum monanthemum.

The section contains small perennial herbs that grow up to 40 centimeters tall. Their stems are erect to prostrate, and are creeping and branching at the base of the plant. They are glabrous and have dark glands on their leaves, seals, and petals. The stems are terete when mature and are normally eglandular, but will very rarely have a few reddish glands. The leaves are opposite, decussate, and sessile or pseudopetiolate. The laminar glands are either pale or black, and can be very dense to almost absent, and are relatively small. The species are normally 1-15 flowered, but in rare cases can have up to 50 flowers. They grow from one or two nodes, with lower subsidiary branches, and are stellate and homostylous. They have five sepals, five petals, five stamen fascicles with 10–45 total stamens, and 2–4 ovaries. The seeds are cylindric and not carinate.

Binomial	Common name	Type	Distribution	Image	References
H. daliense N.Robson (2001)		Perennial herb			
H. himalaicum N.Robson (1977)		Perennial herb			
H. ludlowii N.Robson (1983)		Perennial herb			
H. monanthemum Hook.f. & Thomson ex Dyer (1874)		Perennial herb			
H. subcordatum (R.Keller) N.Robson (2001)		Perennial herb			
H. trigonum Hand.-Mazz. (1931)		Perennial herb			
H. wightianum Wall. ex Wight & Arn. (1834)		Perennial herb			

== Sect. Myriandra ==
Myriandra (Spach) R. Keller contains shrubs, shrublets, and perennial herbs that grow to be up to 4.5 m.

Binomial	Common name	Type	Distribution	Image	References
Subsection Ascyrum
H. crux-andreae (L.) Crantz	Atlantic St. Peter's Wort	Shrub			
H. edisonianum (Small) W.P. Adams & N.Robson	Arcadian St. John's Wort	Shrub	United States		
H. hypericoides (L.) Crantz	St. Andrew's Cross	Shrub/Wiry shrublet	United States, Mexico, Central America		
H. suffruticosum W.P. Adams & N.Robson	Pineland St. John's Wort	Dwarf shrub	United States		
H. tetrapetalum Lam.	Four-Petaled St. John's Wort	Shrub/Perennial herb	United States, Cuba		
Subsection Brathydium
H. dolabriforme Vent.	Straggling St. John's Wort	Subshrub	United States		
H. myrtifolium Lam.	Myrtle-leaf St. John's Wort	Shrub	United States		
Subsection Centrosperma
H. brachyphyllum (Spach) Steud.	Coastal Plain St. John's Wort	Shrub	United States		
H. chamaenerium (Spach) Steud.	Roundfruit St. John's Wort				
H. chapmanii W.P. Adams	Apalachicola St. John's Wort	Shrub	United States (Florida)		
H. densiflorum Pursh	Dense St. John's Wort	Shrub	Eastern United States		
H. exile W.P. Adams	Florida Sands St. John's Wort		Southeastern United States		
H. fasciculatum Lam.	Peelbark St. John's Wort Sandweed	Shrub	United States		
H. frondosum Michx.	Cedarglade St. John's Wort	Shrub	United States		
H. galioides Lam.	Bedstraw St. John's Wort	Shrub	United States		
H. glomeratum Small					
H. kalmianum L.	Kalm's St. John's Wort	Shrublet	United States, Canada		
H. lissophloeus W.P. Adams	Smoothbark St. John's Wort	Shrub	United States		
H. lloydii (Svenson) P.B.Adams	Sandhill St. John's Wort	Shrub	United States		
H. lobocarpum Gatt.	Fivelobe St. John's Wort	Shrub	United States		
H. nitidum Lam.	Carolina St. John's Wort	Shrub/small tree	United States, Cuba, Belize		
H. opacum Torr. & A. Gray					
H. prolificum L.	Shrubby St. John's Wort	Shrub	United States, Canada		
H. swinkianum G.Wilh. & L. Rericha	Swink's St. Johns wort	Shrub			
H. tenuifolium Pursh	Atlantic St. John's Wort	Shrub			
Subsection Pseudobrathydium
H. buckleyi M.A.Curtis	Buckley's St. John's Wort	Shrub			
Subsection Suturosperma
H. adpressum W.P.C. Barton	Creeping St. John's Wort	Perennial herb			
H. apocynifolium Small	Early St. John's Wort	Shrub			
H. cistifolium Lam.	Roundpod St. John's Wort	Shrub/subshrub			
H. ellipticum Hook.	Pale St. John's Wort	Perennial herb	Canada, United States		
H. microsepalum (Torr. & A. Gray) A. Gray ex S. Watson	Flatwoods St. John's Wort	Shrub			
H. nudiflorum Michx. ex Willd.	Early St. John's Wort	Shrub			
H. sphaerocarpum Michx.	Roundseed St. John's Wort	Subshrub/perennial herb		''H. sphaerocarpum'' in a cedar glade in Meigs County, Tennessee	

== Sect. Oligostema ==
Oligostema (Boiss.) Stef. consists of perennial and annual herbs up to 75 cm tall.

Binomial	Common name	Type	Distribution	Image	References
H. andjerinum Font Quer & Pau		Perennial herb	Morocco		
H. australe Ten.	Southern St. John's Wort	Perennial herb			
H. humifusum L.	Trailing St. John's Wort	Perennial/ biennial/annual herb			
H. kelleri Bald.	Keller's St. John's Wort	Perennial herb			
H. linariifolium Vahl	Toadflax-leaved St. John's Wort	Perennial herb			
H. repens L.		Perennial herb			

== Sect. Olympia ==
Olympia (Spach) Nymam contains four dwarf shrubs. Its type species is H. olympicum.

Binomial	Common name	Type	Distribution	Image	References
H. auriculatum (N.Robson & Hub.-Mor.) N.Robson (2010)		Shrub/subshrub			
H. lycium (N.Robson & Hub.-Mor.) N.Robson (2010)		Shrub/subshrub			
H. olympicum L. (1753)	Mount Olympus St. John's Wort	Shrub/subshrub	Balkans		
H. polyphyllum Boiss. & Balansa (1856)		Shrub/subshrub	Southeastern Turkey, Syria		

== Sect. Origanifolia ==
Origanifolia Spach contains 13 species of shrub-like perennial herbs. Its type species is H. origanifolium.

Binomial	Common name	Type	Distribution	Image	References
H. albiflorum (Hub.-Mor.) N.Robson		Perennial herb	Turkey		
H. aviculariifolium Jaub. & Spach		Perennial herb	Turkey		
H. bourgaei (Boiss.) N.Robson		Perennial herb	Turkey		
H. cymbiferum Boiss. & Balansa		Perennial herb	Turkey		
H. ichelense N.Robson		Perennial herb	Turkey		
H. imbricatum Poulter		Perennial herb	Turkey		
H. laxiflorum N.Robson		Perennial herb	Turkey		
H. leprosum Boiss.		Perennial herb	Turkey		
H. origanifolium Willd.		Perennial herb	Georgia, Syria, Turkey		
H. papillare Boiss. & Heldr.		Perennial herb	Turkey		
H. salsugineum N.Robson & Hub.-Mor.		Perennial herb	Turkey		
H. trachyphyllum Griseb.		Perennial herb	Turkey		
H. uniflorum Boiss. & Heldr.		Perennial herb	Turkey		

== Sect. Psorophytum ==
Psorophytum (Spach) Nyman contains a single species, H. balearicum.

Binomial	Common name	Type	Distribution	Image	References
H. balearicum L. (1753)	Hipérico de las Baleares	Shrub/small tree	Balearic Islands	''H. balearicum'' at the University of California, Berkeley Botanical Garden	

== Sect. Roscyna ==
Roscyna (Spach) R. Keller contains 2 species: its type species, H. ascyron, and H. przewalskii. Roscyna was once considered to be its own individual genus which contained only the two species. H. ascyron has two subspecies, H. ascyron ascyron and H. ascyron gebleri.

Binomial	Common name	Type	Distribution	Image	References
H. ascyron L. (1753)	Great St. John's Wort	Perennial herb			
H. przewalskii Maxim. (1881)	Przewalski's St. John's Wort	Perennial herb	China		

== Sect. Sampsonia ==
Sampsonia N.Robson contains two species: its type species, H. sampsonii, and H. assamicum.

Binomial	Common name	Type	Distribution	Image	References
H. assamicum S.N.Biswas (1971)	Assamese St. John's Wort	Perennial herb	India		
H. sampsonii Hance (1865)	Sampson's St. John's Wort	Perennial herb	China, Japan, Southeast Asia		

== Sect. Santomasia ==
Santomasia (N.Robson) N.Robson contains a single species, H. steyermarkii.

Binomial	Common name	Type	Distribution	Image	References
H. steyermarkii Standl. (1940)		Unknown	Guatemala, Mexico		

== Sect. Taeniocarpium ==
Taeniocarpium Jaub. & Spach contains small wiry perennial herbs up to 1.1 meters tall.

Binomial	Common name	Type	Distribution	Image	References
H. armenum Jaub. & Spach		Perennial herb	Eastern Turkey, Armenia		
H. confertum Choisy		Perennial herb	Turkey to Lebanon, Cyprus		
H. crenulatum Boiss.		Dwarf shrub	Central Anatolia		
H. fissurale Woronow	Cracked St. John's Wort	Perennial herb	Turkey		
H. havvae Güner		Perennial herb	Turkey		
H. hirsutum L.	Hairy St. John's Wort	Perennial herb	Western Europe		
H. kotschyanum Boiss.		Perennial herb	Turkey		
H. linarioides Bosse		Perennial herb	Caucasia, Middle East, Turkey, Russia, Balkans		
H. malatyanum Peșmen		Perennial herb	Turkey		
H. marginatum Woronow		Perennial herb	Turkey		
H. monadenum N.Robson		Perennial herb	Southern Turkey		
H. neurocalycinum Boiss. & Heldr.		Perennial herb	Central Turkey		
H. nummularioides Trautv.		Perennial herb	Russia, Georgia, Turkey		
H. nummularium L.		Perennial herb	France, Spain, Italy (Extinct)		
H. peshmenii Yıld.		Perennial herb	Turkey		
H. pruinatum Boiss. & Balansa		Shrublet/ Perennial herb	Turkey, Georgia		
H. pseudorepens N.Robson		Perennial herb	Turkey		
H. pulchrum L.	Slender St. John's Wort	Perennial herb	Western Europe		
H. pumilio Bornm.		Shrublet	Turkey		
H. saxifragum N.Robson & Hub.-Mor.		Perennial herb	Turkey		
H. taygeteum Quézel & Contandr.		Perennial herb	Greece		
H. theodori Woronow	Theodor's St. John's Wort	Perennial herb	Azerbaijan		
H. thymifolium Banks & Sol.		Subshrub	Turkey, Syria, Lebanon, Israel		
H. vaccinioides N.Robson		Dwarf shrub	Turkey		
H. venustum Fenzl		Perennial herb	Lebanon, Turkey, Georgia, Armenia, Azerbaijan		

== Sect. Takasagoya ==
Takasagoya (Y.Kimura) N.Robson contains deciduous shrubs and shrublets that grow up to 1.5 m tall.

Binomial	Common name	Type	Distribution	Image	References
H. formosanum Maxim. (1881)	Taiwanese St. John's Wort	Shrub			
H. geminiflorum Hemsl. (1895)		Shrub	Taiwan, Philippines		
H. nakamurai (Masam.) N.Robson (1973)		Shrub			
H. senkakuinsulare Hatus. (1973)		Shrub	Ryukyu Islands		
H. subalatum Hayata (1911)		Shrub			

== Sect. Triadenioides ==
Triadenioides Jaub. & Spach contains 7 species. Its type species is H. pallens. H. haplophylloides has two subspecies: H. haplophylloides haplophylloides and H. haplophylloides devollense. The species of the section are found in the mountain ranges of Turkey and the Levant, and several are confined to the island of Socotra.

Triadenioides contains shrubs and shrublets that grow up to 60 centimeters tall. They grow prostrate to erect and the lower parts of the plant are deciduous. Those confined to Socotra lack dark glands, but the species in the Levant have red to black glands on the flower and sometimes leaves or stems. The leaves are either opposite or 3-whorled and are free and either sessile or petiolate. The species have between one and thirteen flowers that are stellate and have one style. They have 5 petals each which are spreading or erect. They have 3 stamen fascicles with many stamens and have 5 sepals.

Binomial	Common name	Type	Distribution	Image	References
H. fieriense N.Robson (1993)		Shrub			
H. haplophylloides Halácsy & Bald. (1893)					
H. musadoganii Yıld. (2010)					
H. pallens Banks & Solander		Shrublet	Turkey, Syria, Lebanon		
H. scopulorum Balf.f (1882)		Shrub		Specimen (A, left) alongside ''H. toruosum'' (B, right)	
H. ternatum Poulter (1954)		Shrublet	Turkey		
H. tortuosum Balf.f (1882)		Shrub/Shrublet		Specimen (B, right) alongside ''H. scopulorum'' (A, left)	

== Sect. Trigynobrathys ==
Trigynobrathys (Y. Kimura) N.Robson contains shrubs and subshrubs as well as annual and perennial herbs that are very diverse in size and shape.

Binomial	Common name	Type	Distribution	Image	References
Subsection Connatum
H. brasiliense Choisy		Subshrub/annual herb?	Brazil, Paraguay, Bolivia, Argentina		
H. caespitosum Cham. & Schltdl.		Perennial/annual herb	[[Chile]]		
H. campestre Cham. & Schltdl.		Subshrub	Brazil, Paraguay, Argentina, Uruguay		
H. caprifoliatum Cham. & Schltdl.		Subshrub	Brazil, Argentina		
H. carinatum Griseb.		Subshrub/annual herb	Brazil, Paraguay, Argentina, Uruguay		
H. cavernicola L.B. Sm.		Subshrub	Uruguay		
H. connatum Lam.		Subshrub/perennial herb	Brazil, Uruguay, Argentina, Paraguay, Bolivia		
H. cordatum (Vell.) N.Robson		Subshrub/perennial herb	Brazil		
H. cumulicola (Small) P.B. Adams	Highlands Scrub St. John's Wort	Perennial herb	United States (Florida)		
H. denticulatum Walter	Coppery St. John's Wort	Perennial herb	United States		
H. denudatum A. St.-Hil.		Shrub/subshrub	Brazil, Argentina		
H. erythreae (Spach) Steud.	Sparse-leaved St. John's Wort	Perennial herb	United States		
H. gramineum G.Forst.	Grassy St. John's Wort	Perennial/annual herb	Oceania, Vietnam, China, India, Hawaii		
H. harperi R.Keller	Sharplobe St. John's Wort	Perennial herb	United States		
H. legrandii L.B. Sm.		Subshrub	Uruguay		
H. linoides A. St.-Hil.		Subshrub/annual herb	Brazil, Argentina, Uruguay		
H. lorentzianum Gilg ex R. Keller		Subshrub	Brazil, Paraguay, Argentina, Uruguay		
H. microlicioides L.B. Sm.		Subshrub	Brazil		
H. myrianthum Cham. & Schltdl.		Subshrub	Brazil, Argentina, Uruguay		
H. polyanthemum Klotzsch ex Reichardt		Subshrub	Brazil, Uruguay		
H. rigidum A. St.-Hil.		Shrub/subshrub	Brazil		
H. salvadorense N.Robson		Subshrub	Brazil		
H. setosum L.	Hairy St. John's Wort	Perennial/annual herb	United States		
H. silenoides Juss.	Sangrenaria	Perennial/annual herb	Chile, Peru, Ecuador, Colombia, Bolivia, Argentina		
H. teretiusculum A. St.-Hil.		Subshrub	Brazil, Paraguay		
H. ternum A. St.-Hil.		Subshrub	Brazil		
H. virgatum Lam.	Sharpleaf St. John's Wort		United States		
Subsection Knifa
H. anagalloides Cham. & Schltdl.	Creeping St. John's wort	Perennial/annual herb	Canada, United States, Mexico		
H. aphyllum Lundell		Annual herb	Belize		
H. arenarioides A. Rich.		Annual herb	Cuba		
H. boreale (Britton) H. P. Bicknell	Northern St. John's Wort	Perennial/annual herb	Eastern Canada, New England		
H. brevistylum Choisy		Annual herb	Colombia, Ecuador, Peru, Bolivia, Argentina		
H. canadense L.	Lesser Canadian St. John's Wort	Perennial/annual herb	United States, Canada		
H. globuliferum R. Keller		Perennial herb	Madagascar		
H. gymnanthum Engelm. & A.Gray	Clasping-leaf St. John's Wort Small-flowered St. John's Wort	Annual herb	United States, Guatemala		
H. humbertii Staner		Perennial herb	Uganda, DRC, Rwanda, Burundi		
H. japonicum Thunb.	Matted St. John's Wort	Annual herb	Asia, Oceania		
H. killipii N.Robson		Perennial herb	Colombia		
H. lalandii Choisy		Perennial herb	Africa		
H. majus (A.Gray) Britton	Greater Canadian St. John's Wort	Perennial herb	Canada, United States (Introduced to W. Europe)		
H. moranense Kunth		Perennial/annual herb	Mexico		
H. mutilum L.	Dwarf St. John's Wort	Perennial/annual herb			
H. oligandrum Milne-Redh.		Perennial/annual herb	DRC, Zambia, Angola, Namibia		
H. parvulum Greene	Sierra Madre St. John's Wort	Perennial/annual herb	Mexico, Hawaii		
H. pauciflorum Kunth	Fewflower St. John's Wort	Subshrub/perennial herb	Mexico		
H. paucifolium S. Watson		Perennial herb	Mexico, United States		
H. pedersenii N.Robson		Wiry shrublet	Brazil		
H. philonotis Schltdl. & Cham.		Annual herb	Mexico, Guatemala, Honduras		
H. pleiostylum C. Rodr. Jim.		Annual herb	Brazil		
H. pratense Schltdl. & Cham.	Sanguinaria	Perennial/annual herb	Mexico, Central America		
H. pumilum Sessé & Moc.			Mexico		
H. relictum N.Robson		Subshrub	Colombia		
H. scioanum Chiov.		Perennial herb	Eastern Africa, DRC		
H. thesiifolium Kunth		Perennial herb	Costa Rica, Panama, Venezuela, Colombia		

== Sect. Tripentas ==
Tripentas (Casp.) N.Robson contains one long-stemmed perennial herb, H. elodes. Tripentas is sometimes separated into its own genus under the synonyms Elodes (Spach) W. Koch, Martia Sprengel, Perforaria Choisy, Spachelodes Y. Kimura, or Tripentas Casp.

Binomial	Common name	Type	Distribution	Image	References
H. elodes L. (1759)	Marsh St. John's Wort	Perennial herb			

== Sect. Umbraculoides ==
Umbraculoides N.Robson contains a single species, H. umbraculoides, for which the section is named. It is closely related to sect. Ascyreia.

Binomial	Common name	Type	Distribution	Image	References
H. umbraculoides N.Robson (1985)		Deciduous shrub	Mexico		

== Sect. Webbia ==
Webbia (Spach) R. Keller contains a large deciduous shrub that can grow up to 4 meters tall.

Binomial	Common name	Type	Distribution	Image	References
H. canariense L. (1753)	Canary Islands St. John's Wort Granadillo	Shrub/Tree		''H. canariense'' at the Jardín Botánico de Barcelona	

== Extinct ==
Hypericum fossils have been found from the Late Eocene to the present day, with the most commonly found part of the plant being the seeds due to their hardiness. However, a small number of leaves and even pollen have also been found as fossils. The oldest fossil recovered was a seed belonging to the species H. antiquum which was found in Northern Asia. This species is considered to be the common ancestor of the family Hypericaceae.

Binomial	Fossil Status	Temporal Range	Location	Distribution	References
H. antiquum Balueva & Nikitin	Seeds	Neogene	Russia (Siberia)		
H. bornense Mai	Seeds	Oligocene	Germany, Russia		
H. canatalense E. Reid	Seeds	Pliocene	France		
H. coriaceum Nikitin	Seeds	Miocene	Russia	Europe	
H. danicum Friis		Miocene	Denmark		
H. foveolatum Dorof.	Seeds	Pliocene	Belarus	Europe	
H. miocenicum Dorof.		Oligocene–Pliocene			
H. holyi Friis		Middle Miocene	Denmark		
H. rostriformum Jakub	Seeds	Miocene	Belarus	Europe	
H. septestum Nikitin ex Arbuzova		Miocene	Czech Republic, Russia		
H. tertiaerum Nikitin		Oligocene–Pliocene			

== See also ==
- List of Hypericum nothospecies
