= Sandweed =

Sandweed is a common name for several plant species:

- Athysanus pusillus (Brassicaceae), native to western North America
- Hypericum fasciculatum (Hypericaceae), native to the southeastern United States
- Spergula arvensis (Caryophyllaceae), a cosmopolitan weed
