= Hypericum erythreae =

Scientific classification
- Kingdom: Plantae
- Clade: Tracheophytes
- Clade: Angiosperms
- Clade: Eudicots
- Clade: Rosids
- Order: Malpighiales
- Family: Hypericaceae
- Genus: Hypericum
- Section: H. sect. Trigynobrathys
- Subsection: H. subsect. Connatum
- Species: H. erythreae

Binomial name
- Hypericum erythreae (Spach) Steud.

Synonyms
- Brathys erythreae Spach; Hypericum acutifolium Elliott; Hypericum denticulatum var. acutifolium (Elliott) S.F.Blake; Hypericum denticulatum subsp. acutifolium (Elliott) N.Robson; Hypericum virgatum var. acutifolium (Elliott) J.M.Coult.

Species of flowering plant in the St John's wort family

Hypericum erythreae, the Georgia St. John's-wort, sparse-leaved St. John's-wort, or grit St. Johnswort, is a species of flowering plant in the St. John's wort family, Hypericaceae. It is native to the southeastern United States in seepage bogs and roadside ditches. Its name grit St. Johnswort comes from its limited distribution, within the Altamaha Grit region of the Georgia coastal plain.

According to "Hypericum Online", it is found from Maryland to southern Illinois, south to Florida and Louisiana, though this may be in error, as many other sources list it as occurring only in Georgia and South Carolina. Kew's Plants of the World Online notes that it may be extinct in South Carolina.

Georgia St. John's wort was first formally described as Brathys erythraeae in 1836 by Édouard Spach. In 1840, Ernst Gottlieb von Steudel moved it to the genus Hypericum.
