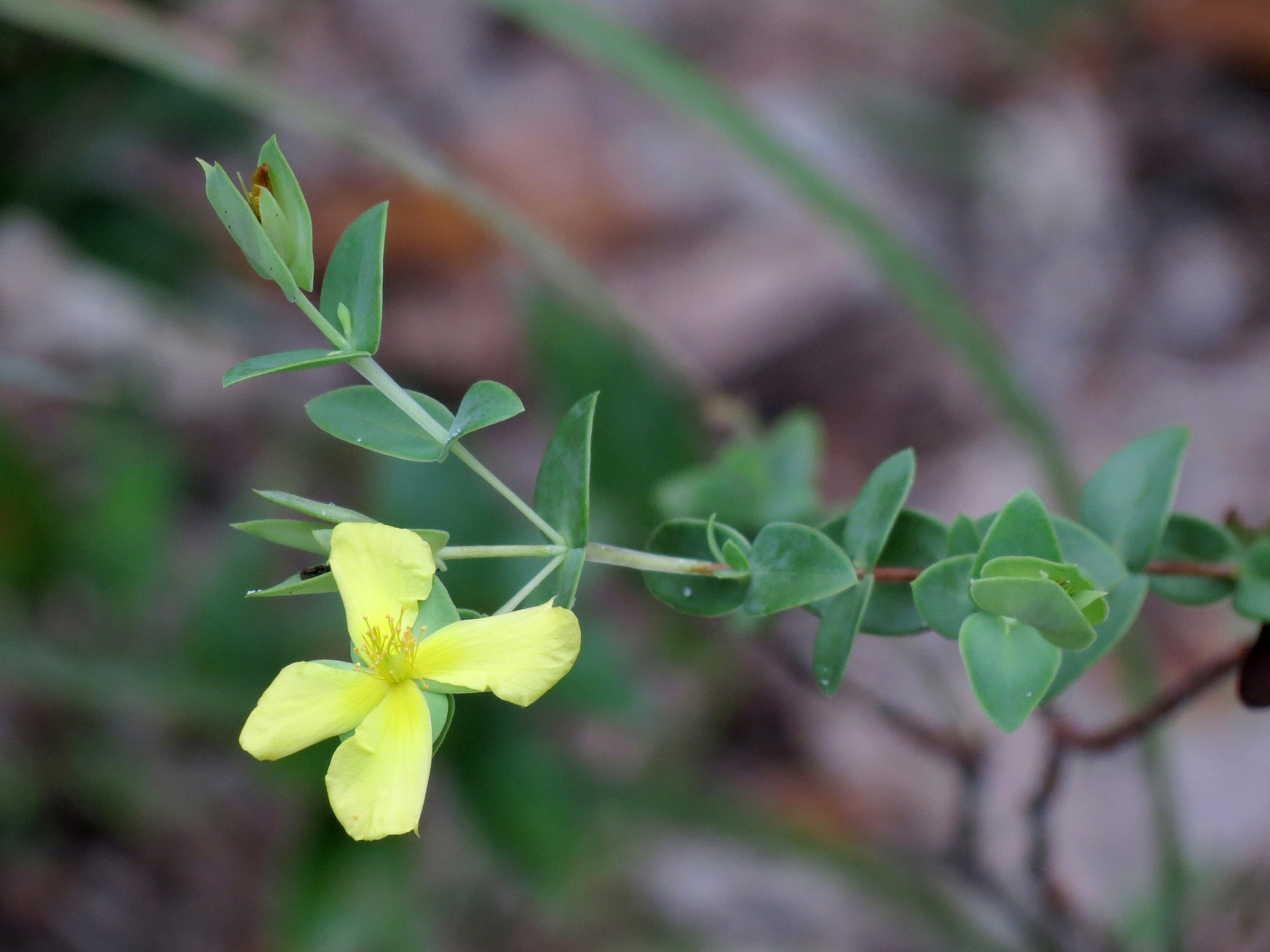

Conservation status
- Secure (NatureServe)

Scientific classification
- Kingdom: Plantae
- Clade: Tracheophytes
- Clade: Angiosperms
- Clade: Eudicots
- Clade: Rosids
- Order: Malpighiales
- Family: Hypericaceae
- Genus: Hypericum
- Section: H. sect. Myriandra
- Subsection: H. subsect. Ascyrum
- Species: H. tetrapetalum

Binomial name
- Hypericum tetrapetalum Lam.

Synonyms
- Ascyrum amplexicaule Michx.; Ascyrum cubense Griseb.; Ascyrum tetrapetalum (Lam.) Vail

= Hypericum tetrapetalum =

Species of flowering plant in the St John's wort family

Hypericum tetrapetalum, the fourpetal St. Johnswort, is a species of flowering plant in the St. John's wort family, Hypericaceae. It is found in the Southeastern United States and Cuba. It was first described by Jean-Baptiste Lamarck in 1797.

== Description ==
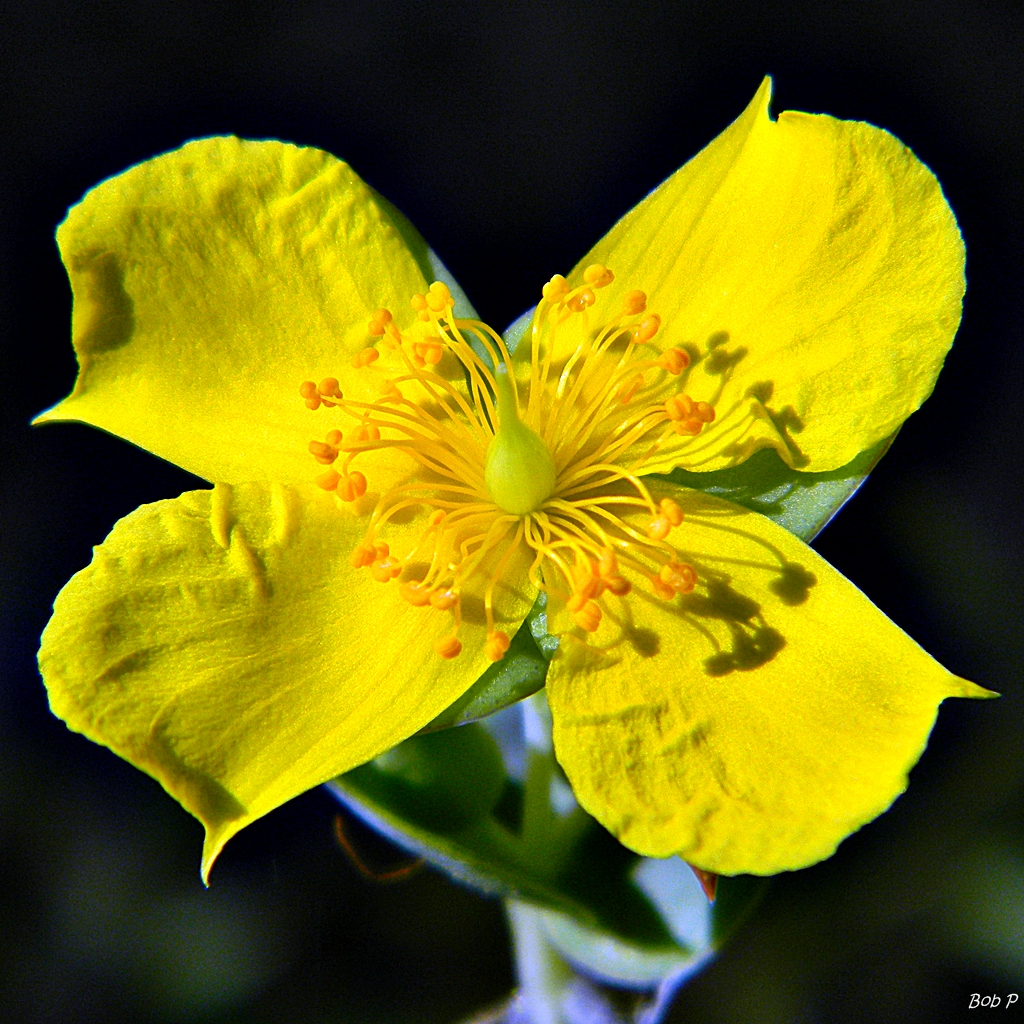
Fourpetal St. John's wort flower

Fourpetal St. Johnswort is a perennial herb or small shrub with a woody base, growing 20–100 cm (7.9–39.4 in) tall. Young stems are two- or four-lined, becoming two-lined or terete as they age. The leaves are oblong to triangular-ovate, 5–35 mm (0.20–1.38 in) long, 4–15 mm (0.16–0.59 in) across, with heart-shaped, clasping bases. The terminal flowerheads produce one to three flowers, each flower 20–30 mm (0.79–1.18 in) in diameter with 4 bright yellow petals and about 100 stamens. It produces flowers throughout most of the year. The capsules are three-parted.

It is distinguished from the closely related Hypericum crux-andreae by its broader leaves with clasping bases. Their distribution overlaps in southern Georgia and northern Florida, but apparent hybrids have not been observed.

== Distribution and habitat ==
In the United States, H. tetrapetalum is found in Alabama, Georgia, and Florida. It is also found in western Cuba.

H. tetrapetalum occurs in wet pinelands and ditches in sandy soil.
