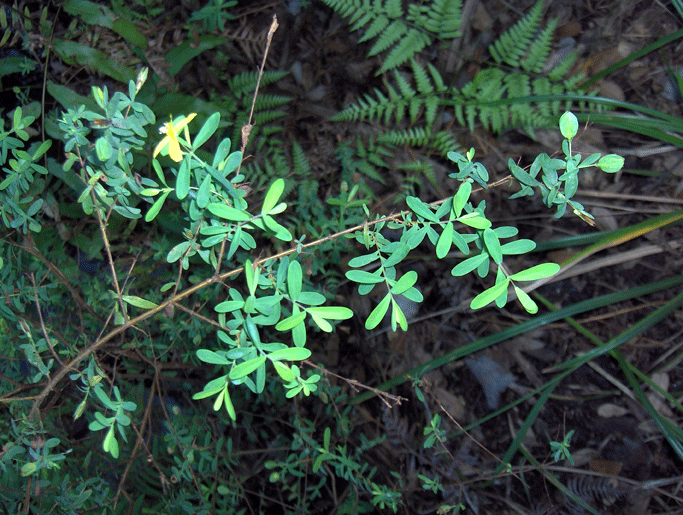

Scientific classification
- Kingdom: Plantae
- Clade: Tracheophytes
- Clade: Angiosperms
- Clade: Eudicots
- Clade: Rosids
- Order: Malpighiales
- Family: Hypericaceae
- Genus: Hypericum
- Section: H. sect. Myriandra
- Subsection: H. subsect. Ascyrum
- Species: H. suffruticosum

Binomial name
- Hypericum suffruticosum W.P.Adams & N.Robson

Synonyms
- Ascyrum nummularifolium Banks ex Steud.; Ascyrum pauciflorum Nutt.; Ascyrum pumilum Michx.

= Hypericum suffruticosum =

Species of flowering plant in the St John's wort family

Hypericum suffruticosum, known as pineland St. John's-wort, is a species of flowering plant in the St. John's wort family, Hypericaceae. It is native to the Southeastern United States.

== Description ==
Pineland St. John's wort is a small, spreading shrub, only 5 to 20 cm (2.0 to 7.9 in) tall, with many-branched stems. The stems are 4-lined when young, exfoliating as it matures, into thin, reddish-brown strips or flakes. The leaves are slightly leathery, 3 to 10 mm (0.12 to 0.39 in) long and 1 to 3 mm (0.039 to 0.118 in) across, sessile or subsessile, with pale undersides. The leaf edge (margin) is flat or slightly recurved.

A single flower is produced in each inflorescence. Each flower is on a pedicel 5 to 12 mm (0.20 to 0.47 in) long, recurved or reflexed at maturity. Each flower is 10 to 15 mm (0.39 to 0.59 in) in diameter with 4 sepals, 4 pale yellow petals, and approximately 30 stamens. The ovary is two parted.

== Distribution and habitat ==
Hypericum suffruticosum occurs in the Atlantic coastal plain in the southeastern United States, in Alabama, Florida, Georgia, Louisiana, North Carolina, and South Carolina. Its habitat includes dry, open, sandy areas such as pine flatwoods and savannas.
