= Hypericum galioides =

Scientific classification
- Kingdom: Plantae
- Clade: Tracheophytes
- Clade: Angiosperms
- Clade: Eudicots
- Clade: Rosids
- Order: Malpighiales
- Family: Hypericaceae
- Genus: Hypericum
- Section: H. sect. Myriandra
- Subsection: H. subsect. Centrosperma
- Species: H. galioides

Binomial name
- Hypericum galioides Lam.

Species of flowering plant in the St John's wort family

Hypericum galioides, the bedstraw St. Johnswort, is a species of flowering plant in the St. John's wort family, Hypericaceae. It is endemic to the Southeastern United States.

== Description ==
It is a slender, branching shrublet up to 1.5 m (4 ft 11 in) tall with linear to oblanceolate leaves. The sessile leaves are 15–37 cm (5.9–14.6 in) long and 1–7 mm (0.039–0.276 in) across with mostly acute tips. The flowers are small, in terminal and axillary cymes, with very narrow sepals. Each flower is 9–14 mm (0.35–0.55 in) in diameter with 5 bright yellow petals and 60–120 stamens. It flowers in the summer, between June and August. The 3-parted fruits are 4.5–6 mm (0.18–0.24 in) long and ovoid.

== Distribution and habitat ==
Hypericum galioides occurs in wet to moist habitats in the coastal plain of the southeastern United States. It has been recorded from North Carolina south to northern Florida and west to the eastern parts of Texas, but excluding most of the Mississippi delta. Habitat types include streambanks, swamps, river bottoms, floodplains, lake edges, wet pine forests, and ditches.
