= Hypericum caespitosum =

Scientific classification
- Kingdom: Plantae
- Clade: Tracheophytes
- Clade: Angiosperms
- Clade: Eudicots
- Clade: Rosids
- Order: Malpighiales
- Family: Hypericaceae
- Genus: Hypericum
- Section: H. sect. Trigynobrathys
- Species: H. caespitosum

Binomial name
- Hypericum caespitosum Cham. & Schltdl.

Species of plant

Hypericum caespitosum, locally known as Ñanco, is a species of flowering plant endemic to Chile, where it is distributed from the Maule to the Los Lagos regions. It grows annually or biennially and grows primarily in temperate climate.
