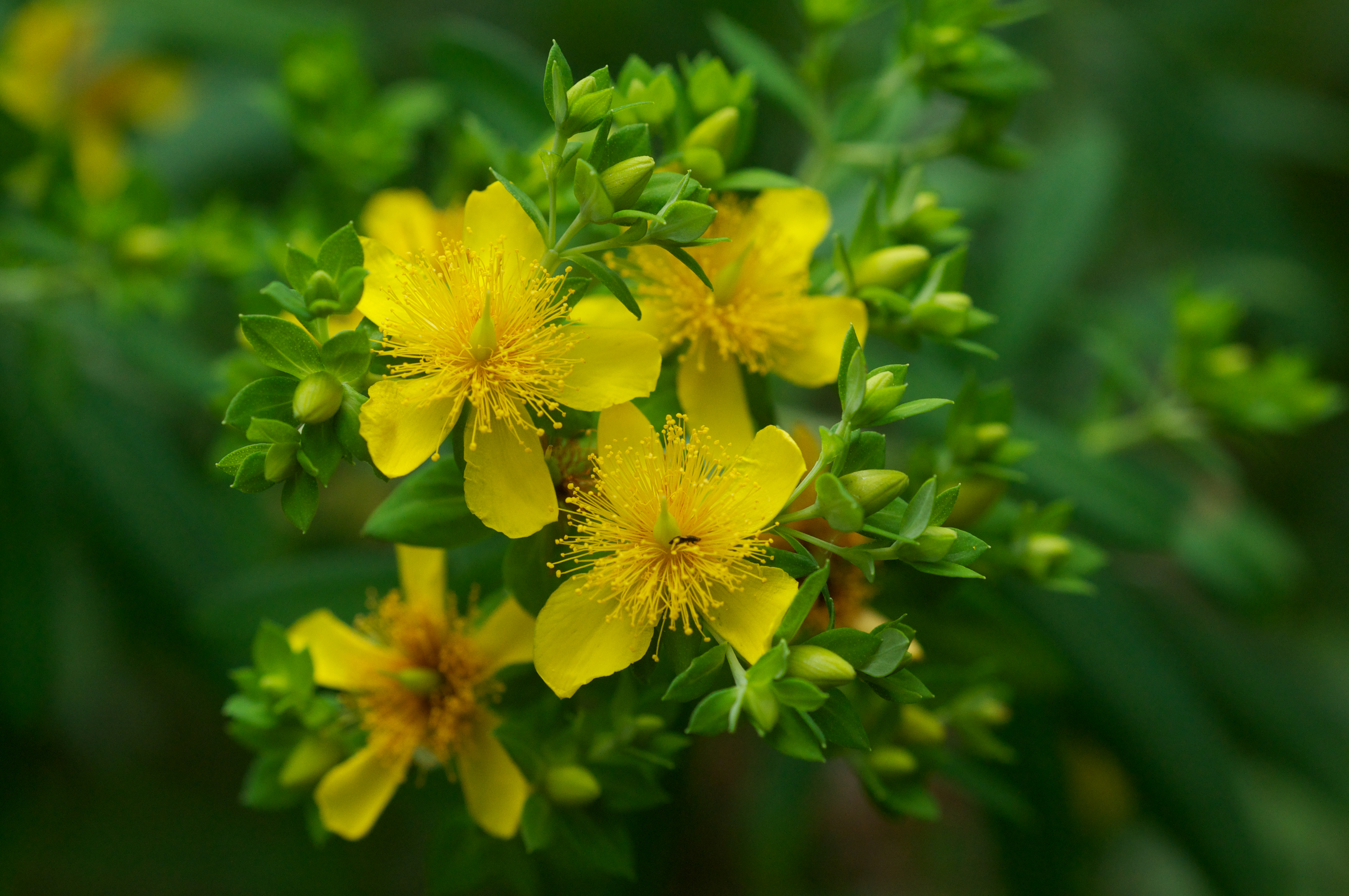

Scientific classification
- Kingdom: Plantae
- Clade: Tracheophytes
- Clade: Angiosperms
- Clade: Eudicots
- Clade: Rosids
- Order: Malpighiales
- Family: Hypericaceae
- Genus: Hypericum
- Species: H. lobocarpum

Binomial name
- Hypericum lobocarpum Gattinger

= Hypericum lobocarpum =

Species of flowering plant

Hypericum lobocarpum, commonly called fivelobe St. Johnswort, is a species of flowering plant in the St. Johnswort family (Hypericaceae). It is native eastern to North America, where it is found primarily in the western portion of the southeastern United States. Its typical natural habitat is in open wet areas, such as stream banks, lake margins, swamps, and pine savannas.

Hypericum lobocarpum is a deciduous shrub with opposite, entire leaves. It produces yellow flowers in the summer. It appears to be closely related to the more eastern Hypericum densiflorum, from which Hypericum lobocarpum can typically be distinguished by its 5-merous ovary and lobed capsules.
