= Hypericum bornense =

Scientific classification
- Kingdom: Plantae
- Clade: Tracheophytes
- Clade: Angiosperms
- Clade: Eudicots
- Clade: Rosids
- Order: Malpighiales
- Family: Hypericaceae
- Genus: Hypericum
- Species: †H. bornense

Binomial name
- †Hypericum bornense Mai

Extinct species of flowering plant

Hypericum bornense is an extinct species of flowering plant in the family Hypericaceae. It was described by botanist D.H. Mai in 1978, based on fossil seed remains from the Early to Late Oligocene found in Saxony, Germany, and Tomsk, Russia. It is likely that the species' habitat was that of a mixed-mesophytic forest.
