= Hypericum miocenicum =

Scientific classification
- Kingdom: Plantae
- Clade: Tracheophytes
- Clade: Angiosperms
- Clade: Eudicots
- Clade: Rosids
- Order: Malpighiales
- Family: Hypericaceae
- Genus: Hypericum
- Species: †H. miocenicum

Binomial name
- †Hypericum miocenicum Dorof. emend. Mai

Extinct species of flowering plant

Hypericum miocenicum is an extinct species of the genus Hypericum. Seeds of the species have been recorded from the Late Oligocene in Germany (Saxony and Lusatia), the Late Miocene in Poland (Poznan), and the Pliocene in Germany (Thuringia). It differs from H. septestum, a more frequently found Hypericum paleospecies, by its thinner foveole walls and the shape of its surface cells, which are more rectangular.

== Taxonomy ==
While Hypericum miocenicum has sufficient identifying characteristics to place it within the genus Hypericum, there is not enough surviving detail to assign it to any subdivisions within the genus.
