= Hypericum setosum =

Scientific classification
- Kingdom: Plantae
- Clade: Tracheophytes
- Clade: Angiosperms
- Clade: Eudicots
- Clade: Rosids
- Order: Malpighiales
- Family: Hypericaceae
- Genus: Hypericum
- Species: H. setosum

Binomial name
- Hypericum setosum L.

Species of plant

Hypericum setosum, commonly known as hairy St. John's wort, is a forb native to the Southeast United States.

== Description ==
Hypericum setosum is an erect, pubescent annual or biennial herb growing 20–75 cm tall, with few branches. Leaves are ascending, sessile, and clasping at the base, with an elliptic-lanceolate to ovate shape. They are simple, opposite, entire, 3–15 mm long and 2–8 mm wide, typically 1-nerved and acute at the tip. Flowers are borne on alternate or terminal ascending branches, forming a cymose inflorescence. Each flower is perfect, regular, and bracteate, with short pedicels or subsessile. There are five ciliate sepals (3–4.5 mm long) and five petals (4–7 mm long), usually yellow or pink and often marcescent. Stamens are numerous and arranged in basal clusters. The ovary is superior and unilocular, with three or four separate styles and capitate stigmas, each style 1.5–2.5 mm long. The fruit is an ovoid capsule, 4–5 mm long and 2.5–3.5 mm wide, dehiscing longitudinally. Seeds are numerous, yellow, lustrous, and about 0.5 mm long, with an areolate surface.

== Distribution and habitat ==
Hypericum setosum is found from Southeast Virginia south to central peninsular Florida and west to Southeast Texas. It grows in pine savannas, wet pine flatwoods and boggy areas, fireplow lines, and scrapes. It is considered a facultative wetland species, though it is occasionally found in non-wetland habitats.

== Ecology ==
Hypericum setosum forms a persistent soil seed bank that can last for several years.
