= Hypericum cohaerens =

Scientific classification
- Kingdom: Plantae
- Clade: Tracheophytes
- Clade: Angiosperms
- Clade: Eudicots
- Clade: Rosids
- Order: Malpighiales
- Family: Hypericaceae
- Genus: Hypericum
- Section: H. sect. Ascyreia
- Species: H. cohaerens

Binomial name
- Hypericum cohaerens N.Robson

Species of flowering plant

Hypericum cohaerens is a flowering plant in the family Hypericaceae.

== Taxonomy ==
Hypericum

Hypericum subg. Hypericum

Hypericum sect. Ascyreia

H. cohaerens
