= Hypericum matangense =

Conservation status
- Vulnerable (IUCN 3.1)

Scientific classification
- Kingdom: Plantae
- Clade: Tracheophytes
- Clade: Angiosperms
- Clade: Eudicots
- Clade: Rosids
- Order: Malpighiales
- Family: Hypericaceae
- Genus: Hypericum
- Section: H. sect. Brathys
- Species: H. matangense

Binomial name
- Hypericum matangense N.Robson

Species of flowering plant

Hypericum matangense is a species of shrub in the family Hypericaceae. It is endemic to Ecuador. It has only been collected once, on the páramos of the Andes in 1980.
