= Hypericum prietoi =

Conservation status
- Endangered (IUCN 3.1)

Scientific classification
- Kingdom: Plantae
- Clade: Tracheophytes
- Clade: Angiosperms
- Clade: Eudicots
- Clade: Rosids
- Order: Malpighiales
- Family: Hypericaceae
- Genus: Hypericum
- Section: H. sect. Brathys
- Species: H. prietoi

Binomial name
- Hypericum prietoi N.Robson

Species of flowering plant in the St John's wort family

Hypericum prietoi is a species of shrub in the family Hypericaceae. It is endemic to Ecuador, where it has only been collected once, in 1945.
