= Hypericum hartwegii =

Conservation status
- Critically Endangered (IUCN 3.1)

Scientific classification
- Kingdom: Plantae
- Clade: Tracheophytes
- Clade: Angiosperms
- Clade: Eudicots
- Clade: Rosids
- Order: Malpighiales
- Family: Hypericaceae
- Genus: Hypericum
- Section: H. sect. Brathys
- Species: H. hartwegii

Binomial name
- Hypericum hartwegii Benth.

Species of flowering plant in the St John's wort family

Hypericum hartwegii is a species of flowering plant, a shrub in the St. John's wort family Hypericaceae. It is endemic to Ecuador. It was collected twice in 1841 in Loja Province, and it has not been seen since.
