= Hypericum quitense =

Conservation status
- Least Concern (IUCN 3.1)

Scientific classification
- Kingdom: Plantae
- Clade: Tracheophytes
- Clade: Angiosperms
- Clade: Eudicots
- Clade: Rosids
- Order: Malpighiales
- Family: Hypericaceae
- Genus: Hypericum
- Section: H. sect. Brathys
- Species: H. quitense

Binomial name
- Hypericum quitense R.Keller

Species of flowering plant in the St John's wort family

Hypericum quitense is a species of flowering plant in the family Hypericaceae. It is endemic to Ecuador. Its occurs in several types of habitats at elevations between 2,000 and 4,050 meters (6,560 and 13,290 ft) in the Andes.
