= Hypericum augustinii =

Scientific classification
- Kingdom: Plantae
- Clade: Tracheophytes
- Clade: Angiosperms
- Clade: Eudicots
- Clade: Rosids
- Order: Malpighiales
- Family: Hypericaceae
- Genus: Hypericum
- Section: H. sect. Ascyreia
- Species: H. augustinii

Binomial name
- Hypericum augustinii N.Robson

Species of flowering plant

Hypericum augustinii is a shrub in the genus Hypericum. It stands 1 metre (3.3 ft) tall. Endemic to Yunnan, China, it has only been found in the far south of the province at elevations of 1200m to 1900m.
