= Hypericum maguirei =

Conservation status
- Vulnerable (IUCN 3.1)

Scientific classification
- Kingdom: Plantae
- Clade: Tracheophytes
- Clade: Angiosperms
- Clade: Eudicots
- Clade: Rosids
- Order: Malpighiales
- Family: Hypericaceae
- Genus: Hypericum
- Section: H. sect. Brathys
- Species: H. maguirei

Binomial name
- Hypericum maguirei N.Robson

Species of flowering plant

Hypericum maguirei is a species of shrub in the family Hypericaceae. It is endemic to Ecuador, where it grows in the páramo of the Andes. It occurs at elevations between 2000 and 4000 meters.
