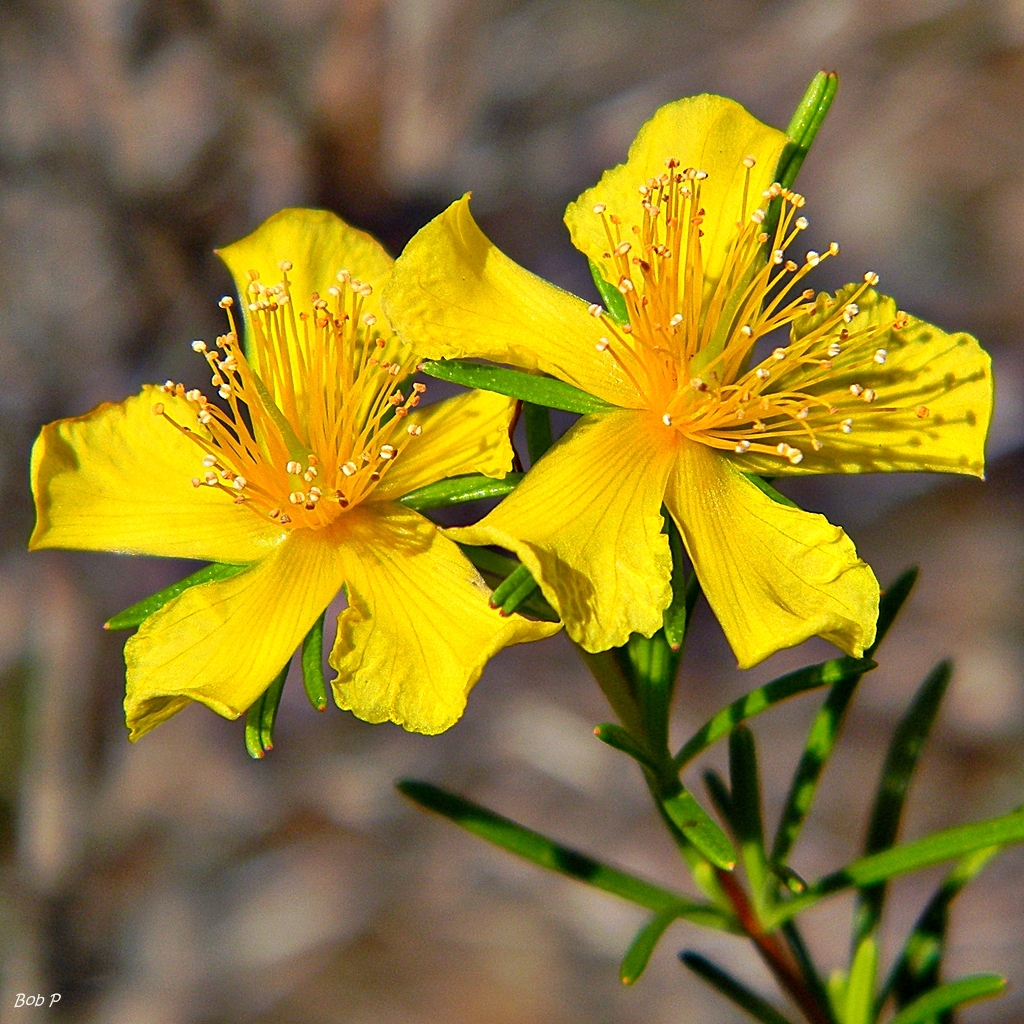
- At Sweetbay Natural Area in Palm Beach County, Florida

Scientific classification
- Kingdom: Plantae
- Clade: Tracheophytes
- Clade: Angiosperms
- Clade: Eudicots
- Clade: Rosids
- Order: Malpighiales
- Family: Hypericaceae
- Genus: Hypericum
- Section: H. sect. Myriandra
- Subsection: H. subsect. Centrosperma
- Species: H. fasciculatum

Binomial name
- Hypericum fasciculatum Lam.

Synonyms
- Brathydium fulgidum (Raf.) K.Koch; Hypericum aspalathoides Willd.; Hypericum fasciculatum var. abbreviatum Alph.Wood; Hypericum fasciculatum var. aspalathoides Torr. & A.Gray; Hypericum fulgidum Raf.; Hypericum galioides var. fasciculatum (Lam.) Svenson; Myriandra brathydis Spach

= Hypericum fasciculatum =

Species of flowering plant in the St John's wort family

Hypericum fasciculatum, known as peelbark St. Johnswort or sandweed, is a species of flowering plant in the St. Johnswort family, Hypericaceae, native to the southeastern United States. It is found from eastern North Carolina, south to southern Florida, west to eastern Louisiana. Kew's Plants of the World Online database also notes that it occurs in Cuba, though Cuba is not listed in several other sources. It was first described in 1797 by Jean-Baptiste Lamarck.

Peelbark St. Johnswort grows in wetlands including wet pine savannas, marshes, cypress ponds, and roadside ditches. It flowers from spring to fall.

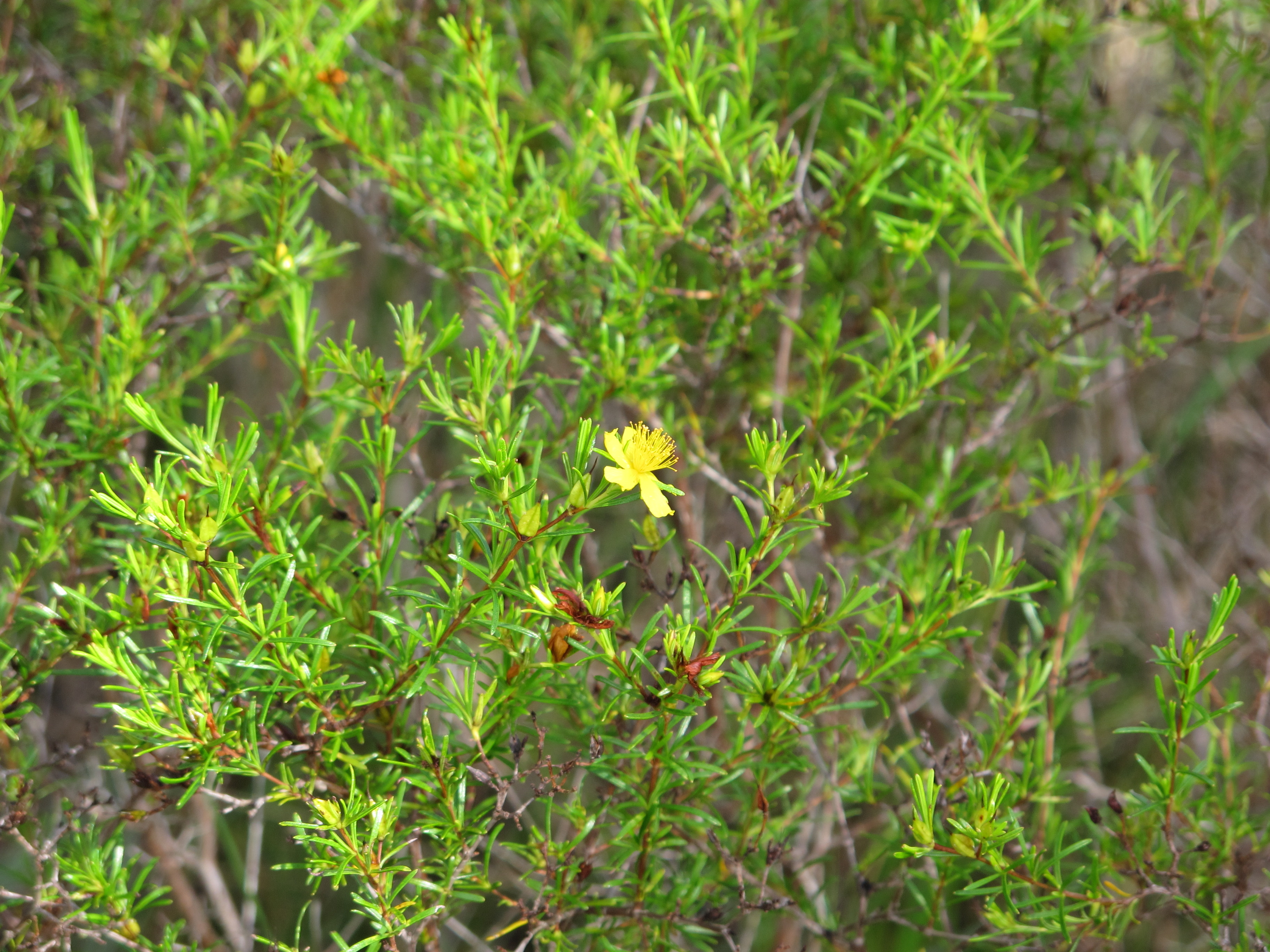
In Palm Beach County, Florida
