= Hypericum australe =

Scientific classification
- Kingdom: Plantae
- Clade: Tracheophytes
- Clade: Angiosperms
- Clade: Eudicots
- Clade: Rosids
- Order: Malpighiales
- Family: Hypericaceae
- Genus: Hypericum
- Species: H. australe

Binomial name
- Hypericum australe Ten.

Synonyms
- Hypericum humifusum subsp. australe

Species of plant

Hypericum australe is a species of plant in the family Hypericaceae. Individuals can grow to 24 cm tall.

== Sources ==
This article incorporates text from a free content work. Licensed under CC0 (license statement/permission). Text taken from Hypericum australe. Encyclopedia of Life.
