= Hypericum styphelioides =

Scientific classification
- Kingdom: Plantae
- Clade: Tracheophytes
- Clade: Angiosperms
- Clade: Eudicots
- Clade: Rosids
- Order: Malpighiales
- Family: Hypericaceae
- Genus: Hypericum
- Subsection: Hypericum subsect. Styphelioides
- Species: H. styphelioides

Binomial name
- Hypericum styphelioides A.Rich

Species of flowering plant in the St John's wort family

Hypericum styphelioides is a perennial flowering plant in the St. John's wort family Hypericaceae. It is endemic to Cuba.

== Infraspecifics ==
Hypericum styphelioides has three accepted subspecies.

- Hypericum styphelioides subsp. styphelioides: western Cuba
- Hypericum styphelioides subsp. moaense: western and central Cuba, Isla de Pinos
- Hypericum styphelioides subsp. clarense: eastern Cuba
