= Hypericum gnidiifolium =

Conservation status
- Critically Endangered (IUCN 3.1)

Scientific classification
- Kingdom: Plantae
- Clade: Tracheophytes
- Clade: Angiosperms
- Clade: Eudicots
- Clade: Rosids
- Order: Malpighiales
- Family: Hypericaceae
- Genus: Hypericum
- Section: Hypericum sect. Camplyosporus
- Species: H. gnidiifolium

Binomial name
- Hypericum gnidiifolium A.Rich

Species of flowering plant in the St John's wort family

Hypericum gnidiifolium is a species of flowering plant in the family Hypericaceae. It is endemic to Ethiopia, where it has been observed at only two locations. It grows next to streams.
