= Hypericum oxyphyllum =

Scientific classification
- Kingdom: Plantae
- Clade: Tracheophytes
- Clade: Angiosperms
- Clade: Eudicots
- Clade: Rosids
- Order: Malpighiales
- Family: Hypericaceae
- Genus: Hypericum
- Species: H. oxyphyllum

Binomial name
- Hypericum oxyphyllum N.Robson

Species of plant

Hypericum oxyphyllum is a species of flowering plant in the St. John's wort family Hypericaceae. It is native to western Sichuan, China, and was described in 2012. A rounded deciduous shrub reaching 1 m (3 ft), its cultivar 'Golden-Ness' has gained the Royal Horticultural Society's Award of Garden Merit as an "ideal" ornamental suited for borders, patios, and containers.
