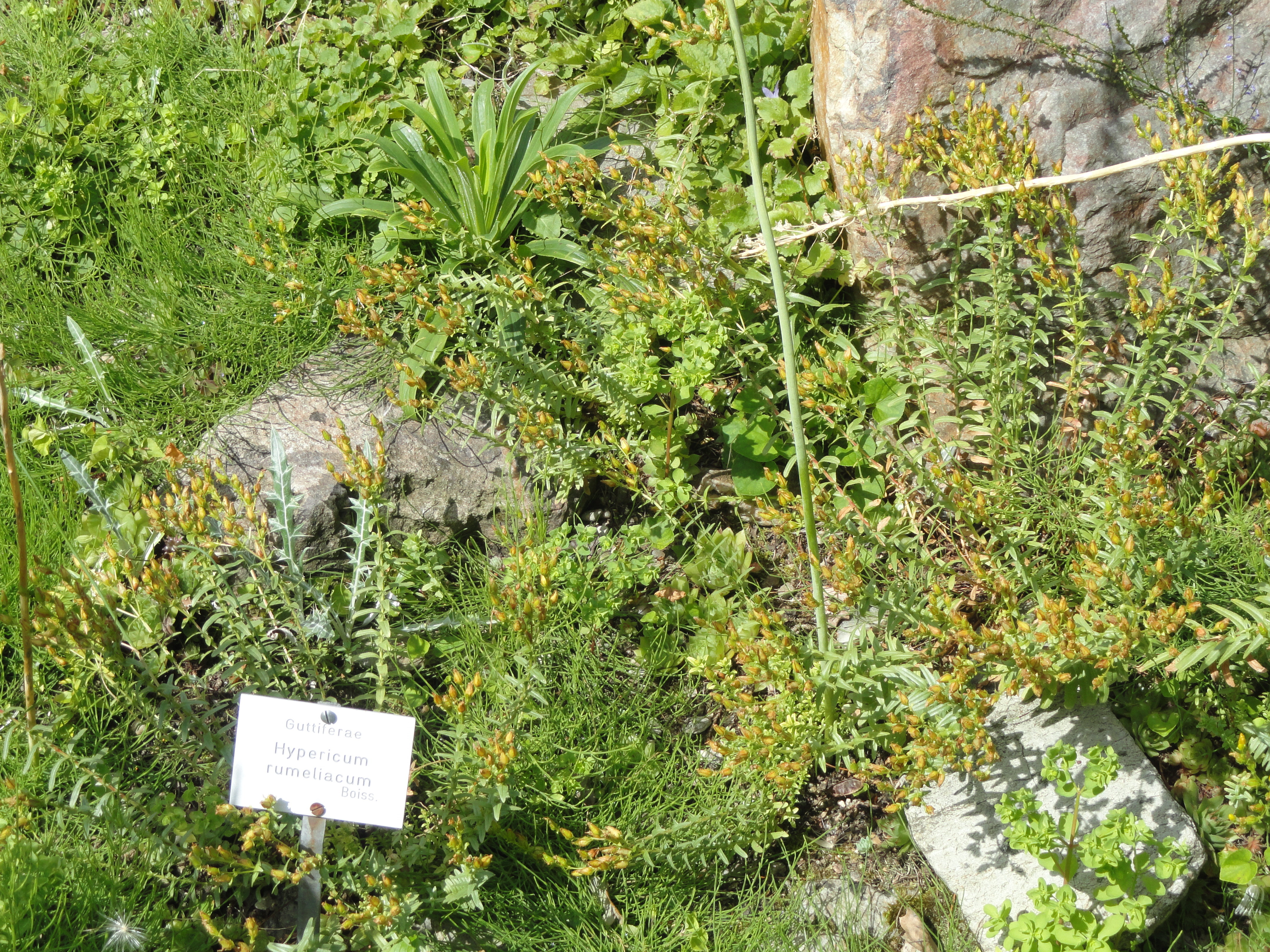

Scientific classification
- Kingdom: Plantae
- Clade: Tracheophytes
- Clade: Angiosperms
- Clade: Eudicots
- Clade: Rosids
- Order: Malpighiales
- Family: Hypericaceae
- Genus: Hypericum
- Section: Hypericum sect. Drosocarpium
- Species: H. rumeliacum

Binomial name
- Hypericum rumeliacum Boiss.

= Hypericum rumeliacum =

Species of flowering plant

Hypericum rumeliacum is a species of flowering plant in the family Hypericaceae, native to southeastern Europe.
