= Hypericum llanganaticum =

Conservation status
- Least Concern (IUCN 3.1)

Scientific classification
- Kingdom: Plantae
- Clade: Tracheophytes
- Clade: Angiosperms
- Clade: Eudicots
- Clade: Rosids
- Order: Malpighiales
- Family: Hypericaceae
- Genus: Hypericum
- Section: H. sect. Brathys
- Species: H. llanganaticum

Binomial name
- Hypericum llanganaticum N.Robson

Species of flowering plant

Hypericum llanganaticum is a species of shrub in the family Hypericaceae. It is endemic to Ecuador. It grows in the Andes at elevations between 3000 and 4500 meters. Most collections have been made in Parque Nacional Llanganates.
