= Hypericum septestum =

Hypericum septestum Temporal range: Miocene

Scientific classification
- Kingdom: Plantae
- Clade: Tracheophytes
- Clade: Angiosperms
- Clade: Eudicots
- Clade: Rosids
- Order: Malpighiales
- Family: Hypericaceae
- Genus: Hypericum
- Species: †H. septestum

Binomial name
- †Hypericum septestum Nikitin

Extinct species of flowering plant

Hypericum septestum is an extinct species of the genus Hypericum that was present during the Oligocene and Miocene epochs. Its holotype is a fossil seed from the Lower Oligocene that was collected in Western Siberia in 1965, and fossils of the species has also been found in other parts of Russia and in the Czech Republic.

== Description ==
The only description of the species is that of the collected fossil seed specimens. The seeds are 0.75–1.4 mm (0.030–0.055 in) long by 0.35–0.6 mm (0.014–0.024 in) wide, and are anatropous and elongated. The seed coat is approximately 0.07 mm thick in the middle of the seed, and is even thinner on its ends. The walls of the testa cells make a pattern of small pits on the surface of the seed, which are 0.04 mm in diameter can be shaped like a square, pentagon, or hexagon. These pits are arranged in nine to twelve rows on each side of the seed. The exotegmen of the seeds consists of a single row of cells which have thick, very porous walls which are rounded or polygonal.

== Taxonomy ==
While Hypericum septestum has sufficient identifying characteristics to place it within the genus Hypericum, there is not enough surviving detail to assign it to any subdivisions within the genus.

=== Infraspecifics ===
- Hypericum septestum var. sibiricum Nikitin
