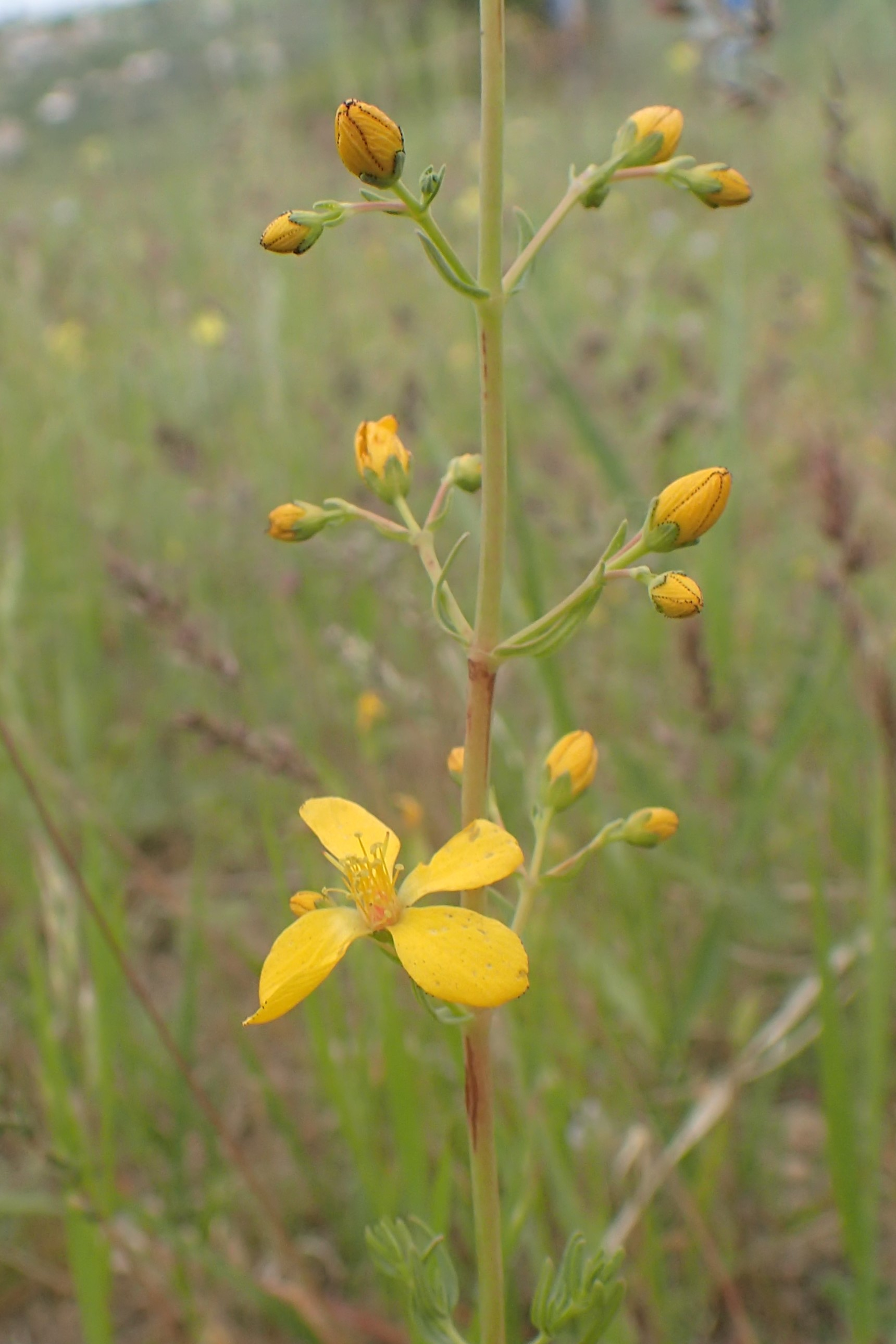

Scientific classification
- Kingdom: Plantae
- Clade: Tracheophytes
- Clade: Angiosperms
- Clade: Eudicots
- Clade: Rosids
- Order: Malpighiales
- Family: Hypericaceae
- Genus: Hypericum
- Subsection: Hypericum subsect. Stenadenum
- Species: H. hyssopifolium

Binomial name
- Hypericum hyssopifolium Chaix (1786)

Synonyms
- Hypericum diversifolium DC. (1815), nom. superfl.; Hypericum fasciculatum Lapeyr. (1813), nom. illeg.

= Hypericum hyssopifolium =

Species of flowering plant

Hypericum hyssopifolium, the hyssop-leaved St. John's wort, is a species of flowering plant of the St. John's wort family (Hypericaceae) which is native to the Mediterranean and Black Sea regions. It grows on chalky or limestone soil in open woods or scrub at elevations of 500–1,800 m (1,600–5,900 ft) in Spain, France, Italy, Bulgaria, Crimea, and the Caucasus.

== Description ==
Hypericum hyssopifolium is a small perennial herb that grows 0.3–0.6 meters tall. Its stems sometimes have scattered amber glands up to the inflorescence. The leaves on the main stem are larger than those on auxiliary stems, and have a flat base and round point, with small pale glands. Each inflorescence can have many flowers from up to ten difference nodes. The flowers are around 1 centimeter in diameter, with globe-shaped buds. The petals are yellow or golden and are the shape of a lengthened oval. They have a narrow stalk-like base and a rounded point. Each flower has around thirty stamens, the longest of which are 0.9 cm. The seeds are dark reddish-brown and 1.8 mm long.

Plants of the species which are in the Balkan population vary from this description in several minor ways, most notably that their leaves are shaped differently, with acute points instead of rounded ones.

== Subspecies ==
Two subspecies are recognized:

- Hypericum hyssopifolium f. hyssopifolium – eastern and southeastern Spain, France, north-central Italy, and Bulgaria
- Hypericum hyssopifolium f. vegetum Woronow – Crimea and the Caucasus

== Ecology ==
The Inventaire National du Patrimoine Naturel (INPN), run by the French National Museum of Natural History, assessed Hypericum hyssopifolium as Least Concern in metropolitan France as a whole, but Vulnerable in the region of Midi-Pyrénées.
