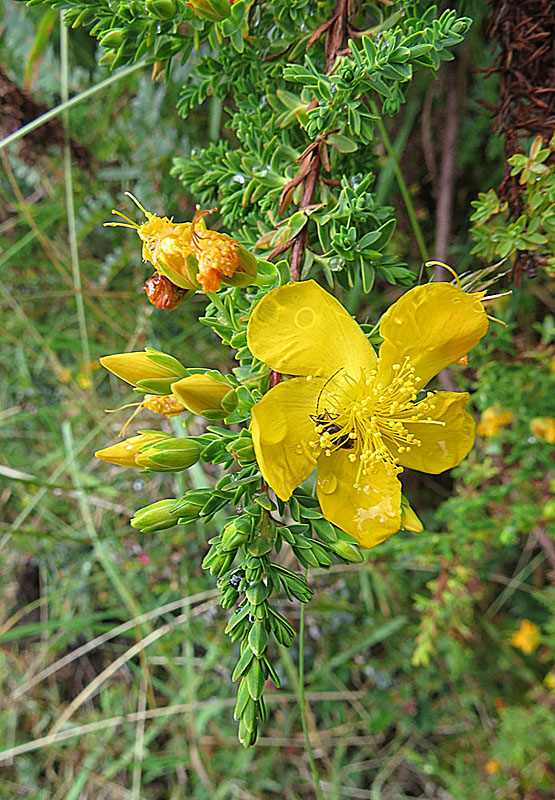
- Photo from Cayambe-Coca Park of Ecuador

Scientific classification
- Kingdom: Plantae
- Clade: Tracheophytes
- Clade: Angiosperms
- Clade: Eudicots
- Clade: Rosids
- Order: Malpighiales
- Family: Hypericaceae
- Genus: Hypericum
- Section: H. sect. Brathys
- Species: H. laricifolium

Binomial name
- Hypericum laricifolium Juss.

= Hypericum laricifolium =

Species of plant

Hypericum laricifolium is a shrub plant in the family Hypericaceae which is native to Venezuela and Peru.
