= Hypericum collinum =

Scientific classification
- Kingdom: Plantae
- Clade: Tracheophytes
- Clade: Angiosperms
- Clade: Eudicots
- Clade: Rosids
- Order: Malpighiales
- Family: Hypericaceae
- Genus: Hypericum
- Section: Hypericum sect. Graveolentia
- Species: H. collinum

Binomial name
- Hypericum collinum Cham. & Schltdl.

Synonyms
- Hypericum preussii R. Keller

Species of flowering plant in the St John's wort family

Hypericum collinum is a flowering plant in the family Hypericaceae which is found in Mexico.

== Description ==
H. collinum is a wiry perennial herb that grows 0.3–0.5 meters (12–20 in) tall. It grows upright with branches on the upper portion that can be divergent to ascending. Its stems lack glands, have two lines, are double-edged above and terete below, and appear as if they are beginning to turn the color of wine red. There are around 10–30 millimeters of stem between each leaf node.
