= Hypericum danicum =

Scientific classification
- Kingdom: Plantae
- Clade: Tracheophytes
- Clade: Angiosperms
- Clade: Eudicots
- Clade: Rosids
- Order: Malpighiales
- Family: Hypericaceae
- Genus: Hypericum
- Species: †H. danicum

Binomial name
- †Hypericum danicum Friis

Extinct species of flowering plant

Hypericum danicum is an extinct species of flowering plant in the family Hypericaceae. The species is known from a fossil seed found among other Hypericum seeds in Italy, and is dated to the Pliocene. It has also been recorded several times from the Søby region of Denmark, also by discovered fossil seeds.
