= Hypericum asplundii =

Conservation status
- Endangered (IUCN 3.1)

Scientific classification
- Kingdom: Plantae
- Clade: Tracheophytes
- Clade: Angiosperms
- Clade: Eudicots
- Clade: Rosids
- Order: Malpighiales
- Family: Hypericaceae
- Genus: Hypericum
- Section: H. sect. Brathys
- Species: H. asplundii

Binomial name
- Hypericum asplundii N.Robson

Species of flowering plant

Hypericum asplundii is a species of flowering plant in the family Hypericaceae. It is endemic to Ecuador, where it is known from a single collection made outside of Machachi.
