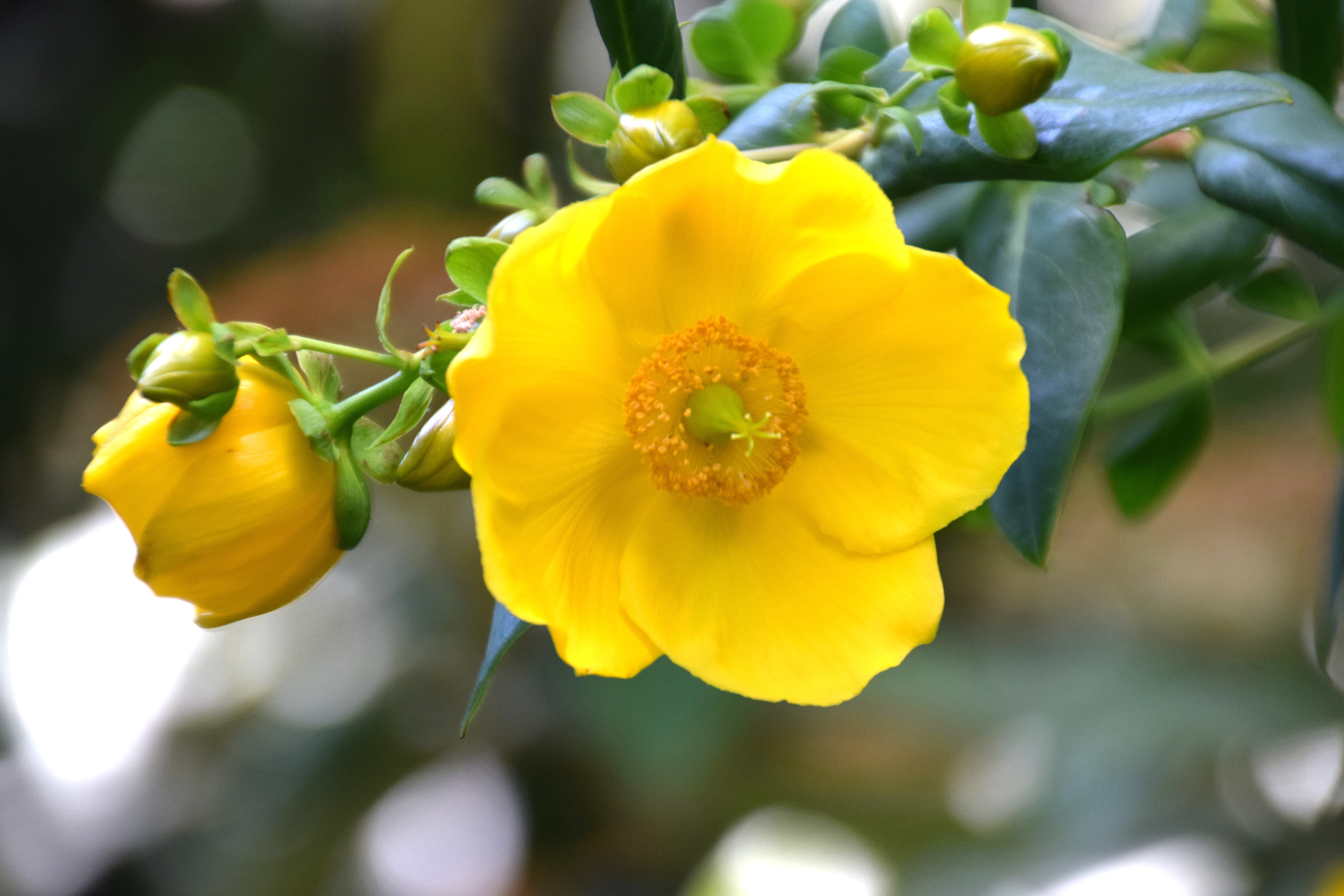

Scientific classification
- Kingdom: Plantae
- Clade: Tracheophytes
- Clade: Angiosperms
- Clade: Eudicots
- Clade: Rosids
- Order: Malpighiales
- Family: Hypericaceae
- Genus: Hypericum
- Section: H. sect. Ascyreia
- Species: H. choisianum

Binomial name
- Hypericum choisianum Wall. ex N. Robson

= Hypericum choisianum =

Species of flowering plant

Hypericum choisianum is a flowering plant in the family Hypericaceae. It is native to North Pakistan to China. It is a shrub, and prefers to grow in temperate biomes.

== Taxonomy ==
Hypericum

Hypericum subg. Hypericum

Hypericum sect. Ascyreia

H. choisianum
