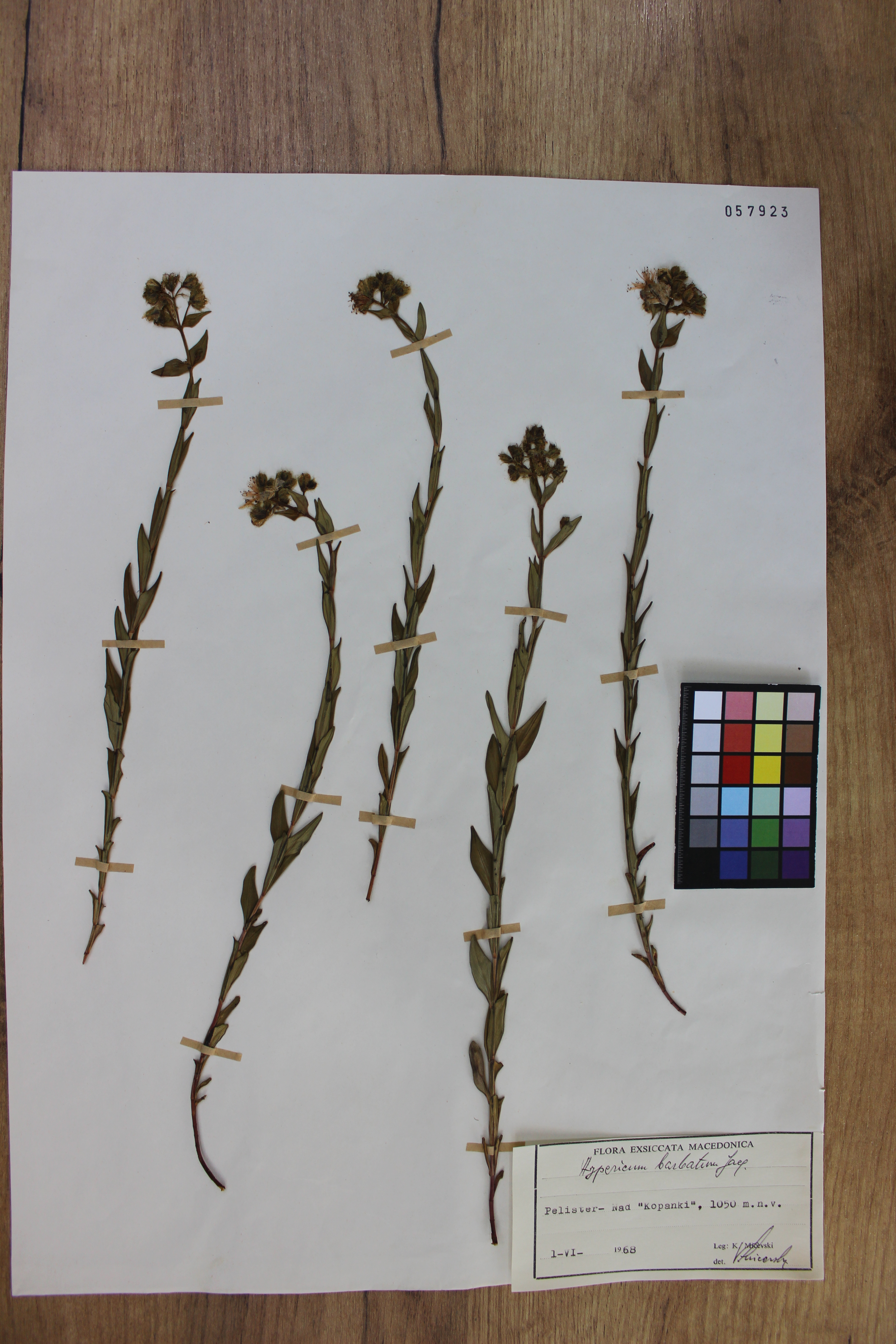

Scientific classification
- Kingdom: Plantae
- Clade: Embryophytes
- Clade: Tracheophytes
- Clade: Spermatophytes
- Clade: Angiosperms
- Clade: Eudicots
- Clade: Rosids
- Order: Malpighiales
- Family: Hypericaceae
- Genus: Hypericum
- Section: Hypericum sect. Drosocarpium
- Species: H. barbatum

Binomial name
- Hypericum barbatum Jacq.

= Hypericum barbatum =

Species of flowering plant in the St John's wort family

Hypericum barbatum is a species of flowering plant in the family Hypericaceae. It is native to southeastern Europe, especially in Greece. The sepals bear many long silky hairs hence the specific name barbatum meaning "bearded".

== Variants/subspecies ==
Hypericum barbatum has 20 known variants or subspecies. The five most prominent are listed.

- Hypericum barbatum subsp. macedonicum
- Hypericum barbatum f. acutifolium
- Hypericum barbatum f. barbatum
- Hypericum aucheri var. punctato-fimbriatum
- Hypericum calabricum
