= Hypericum aciculare =

Scientific classification
- Kingdom: Plantae
- Clade: Tracheophytes
- Clade: Angiosperms
- Clade: Eudicots
- Clade: Rosids
- Order: Malpighiales
- Family: Hypericaceae
- Genus: Hypericum
- Section: H. sect. Brathys
- Species: H. aciculare

Binomial name
- Hypericum aciculare Kunth

Synonyms
- Brathys acicularis; Hypericum laricifolium; Hypericum struthiolifolium

Species of plant

Hypericum aciculare is a shrub in the genus Hypericum, in the section Brathys. It is an accepted name according to The Plant List and Tropicos.

== Distribution ==
The species is found across Ecuador, in the regions Azuay and Loja. It is also less frequently found in Peru in Amazonas, Piura, and Cajamarca.
