= Hypericum lacei =

Scientific classification
- Kingdom: Plantae
- Clade: Tracheophytes
- Clade: Angiosperms
- Clade: Eudicots
- Clade: Rosids
- Order: Malpighiales
- Family: Hypericaceae
- Genus: Hypericum
- Section: H. sect. Ascyreia
- Species: H. lacei

Binomial name
- Hypericum lacei N. Robson

Species of flowering plant

Hypericum lacei is a shrub in Hypericum sect. Ascyreia, in the St. John's Wort genus.

== Description ==
The species has orange stems, uncommon in Hypericum species, that are 4-lined and become terete as the species matures. The leaves are petiolate and oblong and are a dark shade when dry. The inflorescence is 1-6 flowered from just one node and is deciduous. The flowers are 40–50 millimetres (1.6–2.0 in) in diameter and their petals are a golden shade of yellow.

== Distribution ==
The species has only been recorded in Myanmar, in Southeast Asia.
