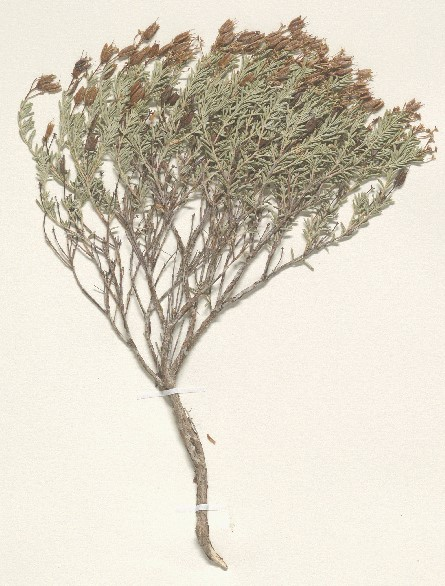
- Herbarium specimen of H. jovis

Scientific classification
- Kingdom: Plantae
- Clade: Tracheophytes
- Clade: Angiosperms
- Clade: Eudicots
- Clade: Rosids
- Order: Malpighiales
- Family: Hypericaceae
- Genus: Hypericum
- Section: Hypericum sect. Coridium; Spach
- Species: H. jovis

Binomial name
- Hypericum jovis Greuter

= Hypericum jovis =

Species of flowering plant

Hypericum jovis is a species of perennial flowering plant in the St John's wort family, Hypericaceae. The species was first described as Hypericum jovis in 1975 by Werner Greuter. Hypericum jovis is native to central Crete.
