= Hypericum holyi =

Hypericum holyi Temporal range: Miocene

Scientific classification
- Kingdom: Plantae
- Clade: Tracheophytes
- Clade: Angiosperms
- Clade: Eudicots
- Clade: Rosids
- Order: Malpighiales
- Family: Hypericaceae
- Genus: Hypericum
- Species: †H. holyi

Binomial name
- †Hypericum holyi Friis

Extinct species of flowering plant

Hypericum holyi is an extinct species of the genus Hypericum that was present from the Lower Miocene to the Upper Miocene. Fossil seeds of the species have been found in Central Europe in general and Central Jutland, Denmark, in particular.

== Taxonomy ==
While Hypericum holyi has sufficient identifying characteristics to place it within the genus Hypericum, there is not enough surviving detail to assign it to any subdivisions within the genus.
