= Hypericum hirtellum =

Scientific classification
- Kingdom: Plantae
- Clade: Tracheophytes
- Clade: Angiosperms
- Clade: Eudicots
- Clade: Rosids
- Order: Malpighiales
- Family: Hypericaceae
- Genus: Hypericum
- Subsection: Hypericum subsect. Platyadenum
- Species: H. hirtellum

Binomial name
- Hypericum hirtellum (Spach) Boiss.

Synonyms
- Drosanthe hirtella Spach

Species of flowering plant

Hypericum hirtellum is a species of flowering plant in the family Hypericaceae. It is native to Iran and Iraq and is found on chalky, sandy soil at elevations of 300–2,000 meters.

== Description ==
The species is a perennial herb that grows up to 0.66 meters tall. It grows either entirely upright, or with the ends of its stems upright. Roots can sometime be seen at the base from which the stems branch. The stems are usually covered in soft white hairs and many small red point-shaped glands. The length of stem between leaves is 5–20 millimeters.

The leaves are directly attached to the stem and are blue-green in color. The leaf blades can vary in size, measuring 4–25 by 1.5–4 mm. They are normally linear in shape, with a round tip and flat base. There are many small pale glands on all parts of the leaf blade except the edges. The leaves are also covered in fine, white hairs on both the upper and lower sides. These hairs are triangular in shape and are covered in many small grooves, and their shape may be an adaptation to the dry habitat of the Irano-Turanian floristic region where the species is found.

Each inflorescence has many flowers and is shaped like a narrow pyramid. They are made up of clusters of 3–11 flowers that are supported by a single stem. The larger bracts are long and narrow, while the smaller bracteoles are lance-shaped. The flowers are around 1–1.5 centimeters wide with petals that curve sharply downwards. The petals are yellow, sometimes with a tint of red, and measure 4–8 by 2–5 mm in size. The sepals are the same length as the petals, and are covered in fine white hairs. Each flower has around 25 stamens with yellow filaments, the longest of which is around 5–7 mm. The seeds are a reddish-brown color and are roughly 2.5 mm long.

== Taxonomy ==
The species was originally described under the name Drosanthe hirtella by Édouard Spach in 1836. The species of Drosanthe were later subsumed into Hypericum, and the species was renamed Hypericum hirtellum by Pierre Edmond Boissier in 1849. In 1967, as part of his monograph of the genus Hypericum, Norman Robson reassigned the Syrian species Hypericum assyriacum to be a variety of H. hirtellum, named H. hirtellum var. assyriacum. The species is most closely related to other species in subsection Platyadenum of section Hirtella, especially Hypericum asperulum, H. scabrum, and H. davisii.
