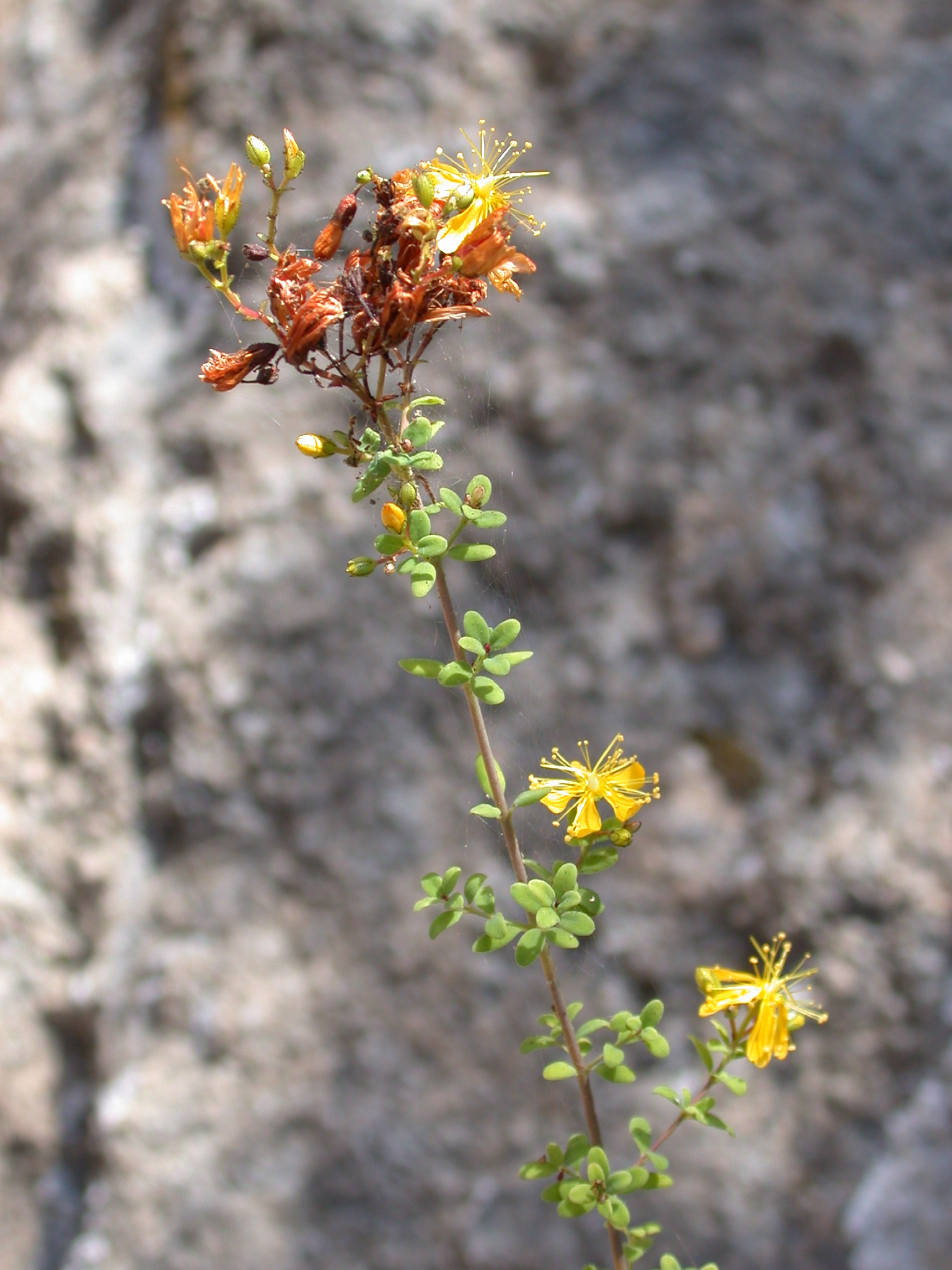

Scientific classification
- Kingdom: Plantae
- Clade: Tracheophytes
- Clade: Angiosperms
- Clade: Eudicots
- Clade: Rosids
- Order: Malpighiales
- Family: Hypericaceae
- Genus: Hypericum
- Section: H. sect. Brathys
- Subsection: H. subsect. Phellotes
- Species: H. humboldtianum

Binomial name
- Hypericum humboldtianum Steud. 1840

Synonyms
- Brathys thymifolia Spach; Hypericum jussiaei Planch. & Linden ex Triana & Planch.; Hypericum struthiolifolium Trev.; Hypericum thymifolium Kunth

= Hypericum humboldtianum =

Species of flowering plant in the St John's wort family

Hypericum humboldtianum is a species of shrubby flowering plant in the St. John's wort family Hypericaceae native to Colombia and Venezuela.

== Taxonomy ==
The closest relative of Hypericum humboldtianum is Hypericum callacallanum in Peru, which has three-nerved sessile leaves and larger flowers.

== Description ==
Hypericum humboldtianum grows 10–75 cm (3.9–29.5 in) tall, with pseudo-dichotomous, divergent or lateral branches. The orange to brown four-lined stems are ancipitous when young and become terete, with their cortex exfoliating in strips. The internodes are 2.5–14 mm (0.098–0.551 in). The sessile or shortly pseudopetiolate leaves are spreading and deciduous, with pseudopetioles 0.5 mm (0.020 in) long. The oblong or oblanceolate leaves are 6–13 mm (0.24–0.51 in) long and 1.2–3 mm (0.047–0.118 in) wide, and are planar or incurved with a prominent midrib. The glaucous and coriaceous leaves have an acute to obtuse apex, a narrow base, and a sheathing pseudopetiole. Leaves have a single basal vein with or without lateral branches, and lack tertiary reticulation. The laminar glands are dense. The inflorescence is one to twelve flowered, branching dichasially or pseudo-dichotomously, with peduncles and pedicels 3–4 mm (0.12–0.16 in) long. The star-shaped flowers are 15 mm (0.59 in) wide. The elliptic to oblanceolate sepals are 14.6–16.5 mm (0.57–0.65 in) long and 1.3–2.2 mm (0.051–0.087 in) wide, with three to five veins and a midrib not prominent. The glands of the sepals are linear below, becoming punctiform in the upper third to upper half. The bright yellow, obovate petals are 6–8 mm (0.24–0.31 in) long and 3–5.5 mm (0.12–0.22 in) wide, with linear glands becoming punctiform distally. The thirty to fifty stamens are 5.5 mm (0.22 in) long at the most. The ovoid to cylindric ovary is 1.5–2 mm (0.059–0.079 in) long and 1 mm (0.039 in) wide. The three styles are about 2–3 mm (0.079–0.118 in) long. The stigmas are capitate. The cylindric-ellipsoid capsule is 4–6.5 mm (0.16–0.26 in) long and 2–3 mm (0.079–0.118 in) wide, equalling the sepals. The seeds are 0.5–0.6 mm (0.020–0.024 in) long and lack carinas.

== Distribution and habitat ==
Hypericum humboldtianum grows in thickets and on slopes of páramo at altitudes between 2,500–3,500 m (8,200–11,500 ft). In Colombia the shrub grows from Valle del Cauca to Norte de Santander and in Venezuela it grows in Mérida.
