= Hypericum monanthemum =

Scientific classification
- Kingdom: Plantae
- Clade: Tracheophytes
- Clade: Angiosperms
- Clade: Eudicots
- Clade: Rosids
- Order: Malpighiales
- Family: Hypericaceae
- Genus: Hypericum
- Section: Hypericum sect. Monanthema
- Species: H. monanthemum

Binomial name
- Hypericum monanthemum Hook.f. & Thomson ex Dyer

Subspecies
- H. monanthemum subsp. monanthemum; H. monanthemum subsp. filicaule (Dyer) N.Robson

Species of flowering plant in the St John's wort family

Hypericum monanthemum is a species of flowering plant of the St. John's wort family (Hypericaceae) which is native to the Himalayan mountains.

== Description ==
Hypericum monanthemum is a perennial herb that varies in height from 0.1 to 0.4 meters (0.33 to 1.31 ft) tall. It can be found growing entirely upright, along the ground and upright towards the ends of the stems, or entirely along the ground. The base at the center of the stems is rooting and branching, and the stems are scattered across it, clustered in groups, or carpeting the whole base. It is often a very slender plant, and is usually unbranched in its upper parts, though it can rarely have a single pair of branches just below the inflorescence which are pointed upwards.

== Taxonomy ==
The species' placement within Hypericum can be summarized as follows:

Hypericum

Hypericum subg. Hypericum

Hypericum sect. Monanthema

Hypericum daliense
Hypericum himalaicum
Hypericum ludlowii
Hypericum subcordatum
Hypericum trigonum
Hypericum wightianum
Hypericum monanthemum

== Uses ==
Despite being considered rare, Hypericum montanum has been recorded as being used in folk medicine in parts of India near the Himalayas, where it is referred to as Tenikmolitong. The whole plant is washed and crushed, and the resulting liquid is strained through fine cloth. The final product is then used as a kind of eye drop to treat irritated or diseased eyes.
