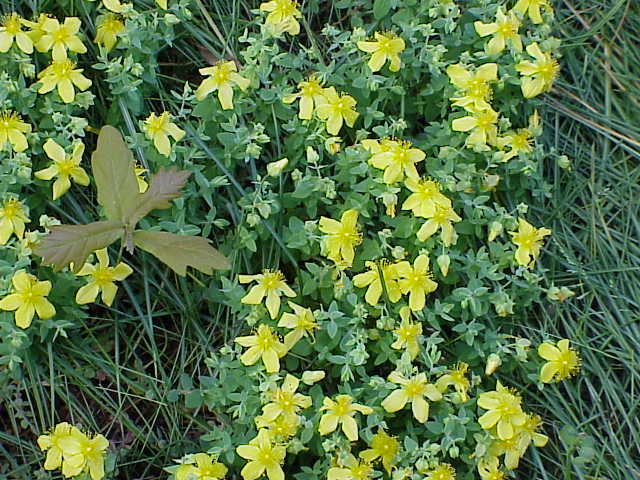

Scientific classification
- Kingdom: Plantae
- Clade: Tracheophytes
- Clade: Angiosperms
- Clade: Eudicots
- Clade: Rosids
- Order: Malpighiales
- Family: Hypericaceae
- Genus: Hypericum
- Section: Hypericum sect. Campylopus; Boiss.
- Species: H. cerastioides

Binomial name
- Hypericum cerastioides (Spach) N.Robson

Synonyms
- Campylopus cerastioides; Hypericum campylopus; Hypericum origanifolium; Hypericum recognitum; Hypericum rhodoppeum

= Hypericum cerastioides =

Species of flowering plant in the St John's wort family

Hypericum cerastioides is a species of perennial flowering plant in the St. John's wort family, Hypericaceae. It is the only species in the section Hypericum sect. Campylopus.

It is sometimes misspelled as Hypericum cerastoides.

== Distribution and habitat ==
Hypericum cerastioides is found in southern Bulgaria, northeastern Greece, and northwestern Turkey. Its habitat includes meadows, rocky areas, and pine-beech woodlands on siliceous soils.
