= Sandhill St. John's wort =

Sandhill St. John's wort is a common name for several plants and may refer to:

- Hypericum lloydii
- Hypericum tenuifolium
