= Hypericum antiquum =

Hypericum antiquum Temporal range: Eocene

Scientific classification
- Kingdom: Plantae
- Clade: Tracheophytes
- Clade: Angiosperms
- Clade: Eudicots
- Clade: Rosids
- Order: Malpighiales
- Family: Hypericaceae
- Genus: Hypericum
- Species: †H. antiquum

Binomial name
- †Hypericum antiquum Balueva & Nikitin (2005)

Extinct species of plant

Hypericum antiquum is an extinct species of the genus Hypericum that was present during the Eocene epoch. The species' fossils are the oldest collected of Hypericum, and it is believed that the species is the common ancestor of the tribe Hypericeae. Fossil seeds have been found in Russia, and the predicted paleoregion of the species stretched across Eurasia. It is theorized that one factor leading to the species' extinction is a global cooling at the end of the Eocene that removed much of its habitat.

== Description ==
Because the only recovered fossils of the species are seeds, the only description available is of said seeds. The collected seeds were approximately 0.5 long by 0.3 mm wide in size and black in color. They are anatropous, and either cylindrical or somewhat flattened in shape. The meshes of the surface are elongated and hexagonal, and are formed by the elongated cells of the testa. One end of the seed is rounded, while the other is slightly narrowed with a small tubercule. The case of the seed is rather thin, and is colored black.

== Distribution ==
Fossils of seeds were collected in the Novosibirsk Oblast of Russia from a borehole at a depth of 250 meters (820 ft).

== Taxonomy and etymology ==
One possible origin of the genus name Hypericum is that it is derived from the Greek words hyper (above) and eikon (picture), in reference to the tradition of hanging the plant over religious icons in the home. The specific epithet antiquum derives from the Latin word antiquus which means "archaic" or "old".

Hypericum antiquum was first described in 2005 in volume 4 of the Russian series Iskopaemye Tsvetkovye Rastenija Rossii I Sopredel'nykh Gosudarstv (Fossil Flowering Plants of Russia and Adjacent States) by G.A. Balueva and V.P. Nikitin. While seeds of the species showed characteristics present in sections Elodea, Trigynobrathys, Brathys, and Drosocarpium, sufficient similarities have not been found to place it in one of the sections. Specifically, the sclariform seed testa are common among all of these sections, leading researchers to place Hypericum antiquum in the "crown node" of Hypericum, or in other words, as its common ancestor from which all modern species of the genus are descended.
