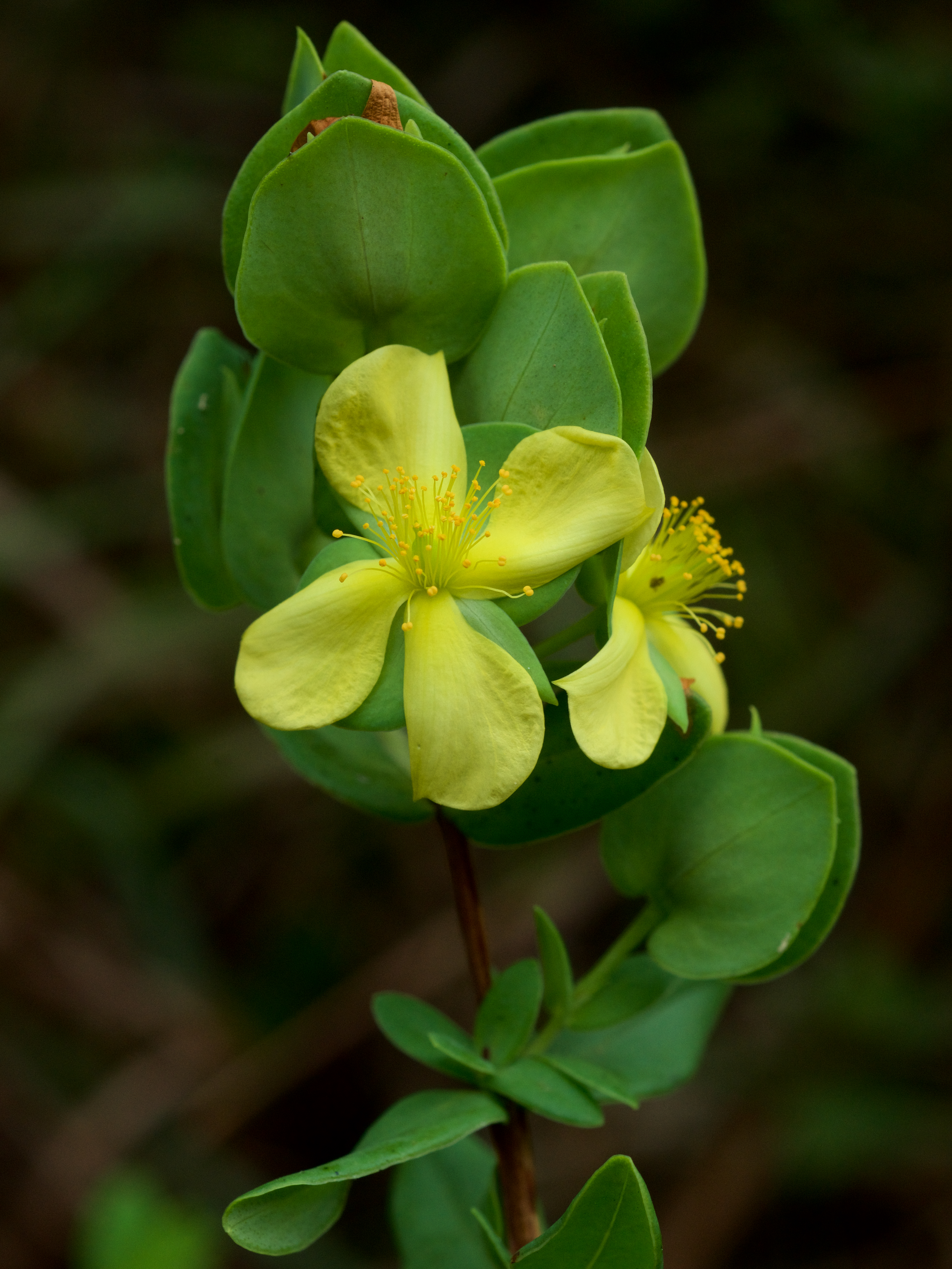

Scientific classification
- Kingdom: Plantae
- Clade: Tracheophytes
- Clade: Angiosperms
- Clade: Eudicots
- Clade: Rosids
- Order: Malpighiales
- Family: Hypericaceae
- Genus: Hypericum
- Section: H. sect. Myriandra
- Subsection: H. subsect. Ascyrum
- Species: H. crux-andreae

Binomial name
- Hypericum crux-andreae (L.) Crantz

Synonyms
- Hypericum stans (Michx.) Adams & Robson

= Hypericum crux-andreae =

Species of flowering plant in the St John's wort family

Hypericum crux-andreae, commonly called St. Peter's-wort, is a small shrubby flowering plant in the St. John's wort family Hypericaceae. It is native to Eastern North America, where it is primarily found in the sandy soils of the Coastal Plain with extensions into the Piedmont and Cumberland Plateau.

H. crux-andreae is a perennial shrub that may reach a height between 4 and 10 decimeters (approximately 1.3 to 3.3 feet). Its leaves are simple and oppositely arranged, reaching a length between 1 and 4 centimeters. The flowers have 4 or 5 petals, yellow or pink in color.

It is found in wet flatwoods, and generally in wet, open, sandy areas such as bogs or seeps, although it is occasionally found in drier habitats.
