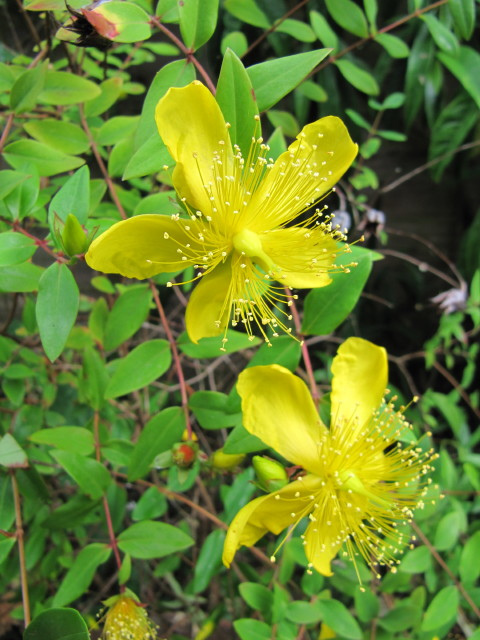

Scientific classification
- Kingdom: Plantae
- Clade: Tracheophytes
- Clade: Angiosperms
- Clade: Eudicots
- Clade: Rosids
- Order: Malpighiales
- Family: Hypericaceae
- Genus: Hypericum
- Section: H. sect. Ascyreia
- Species: H. kouytchense

Binomial name
- Hypericum kouytchense H.Lév.

= Hypericum kouytchense =

Species of flowering plant in the St John's wort family

Hypericum kouytchense, the large-flowered St John's wort, is a species of flowering plant in the family Hypericaceae, native to Western China. Growing up to 3 ft (0.91 m) tall and 5 ft (1.5 m) wide, it is a semi-evergreen rounded shrub with blue-green leaves and large yellow flowers with prominent stamens, appearing in midsummer. Flowers are followed by red seed capsules in autumn. Where conditions are favourable it can retain its leaves all year.

The Latin specific epithet kouytchense is a westernisation of Guizhou, a southwestern province of China identified as a hotspot for biodiversity.

This plant, which is hardy down to −15 °C (5 °F), is cultivated in temperate regions. In the UK, it has gained the Royal Horticultural Society's Award of Garden Merit. It has been reported as invasive in the U.S. state of Hawaii.
