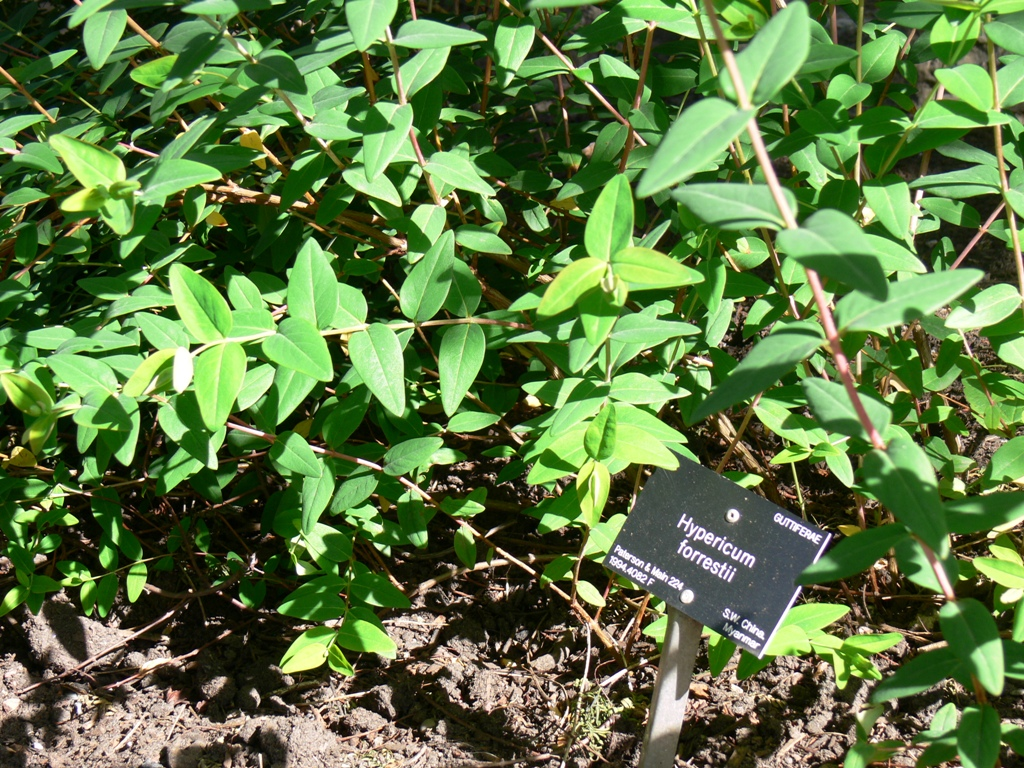
- Cultivated specimen

Scientific classification
- Kingdom: Plantae
- Clade: Tracheophytes
- Clade: Angiosperms
- Clade: Eudicots
- Clade: Rosids
- Order: Malpighiales
- Family: Hypericaceae
- Genus: Hypericum
- Section: H. sect. Ascyreia
- Species: H. forrestii

Binomial name
- Hypericum forrestii (Chitt.) N.Robson

= Hypericum forrestii =

Species of flowering plant in the St John's wort family

Hypericum forrestii is a species of flowering plant in the family Hypericaceae native to China and Myanmar. It is known as Forrest's tutsan and Forrest's St. John's wort. It was named in honour of the Scottish botanist George Forrest (1873–1932), who was the first westerner to discover it. The species has gained the Royal Horticultural Society's Award of Garden Merit.

== Description ==
It is a semi-evergreen shrub growing to 1.2 m (4 ft) tall by 1.5 m (5 ft) broad. It has oval leaves which turn red in autumn and bowl-shaped yellow flowers with prominent stamens in late summer.

== Distribution ==
Forrest's St. John's wort is native to Yunnan and Sichuan provinces in China, and northeastern Myanmar. It has been recorded as a garden escape in locations in the British Isles, and as an invasive species. It may be under-recorded due to confusion with other St. John's wort species such as Hypericum 'Hidcote'.

== Gallery ==
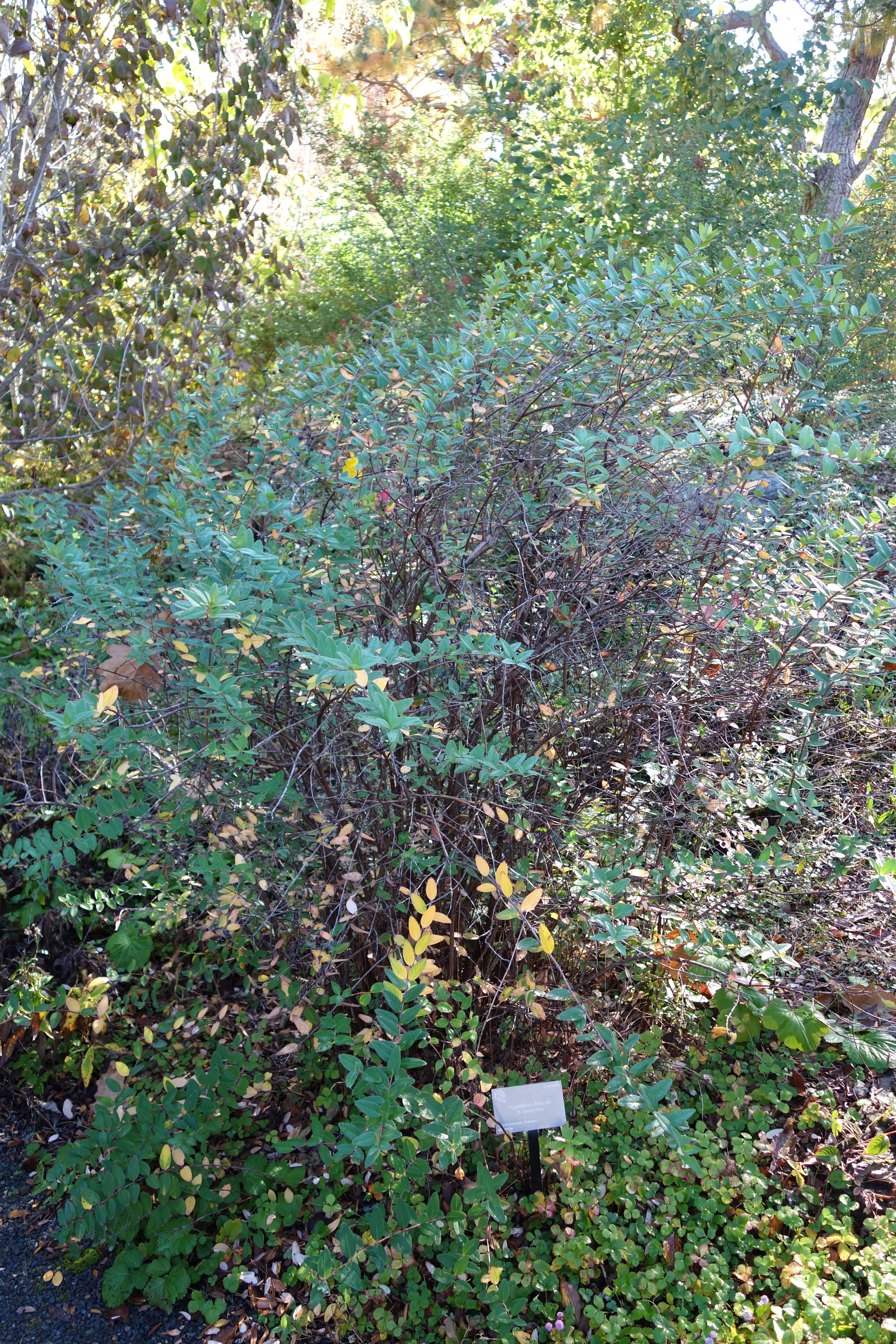

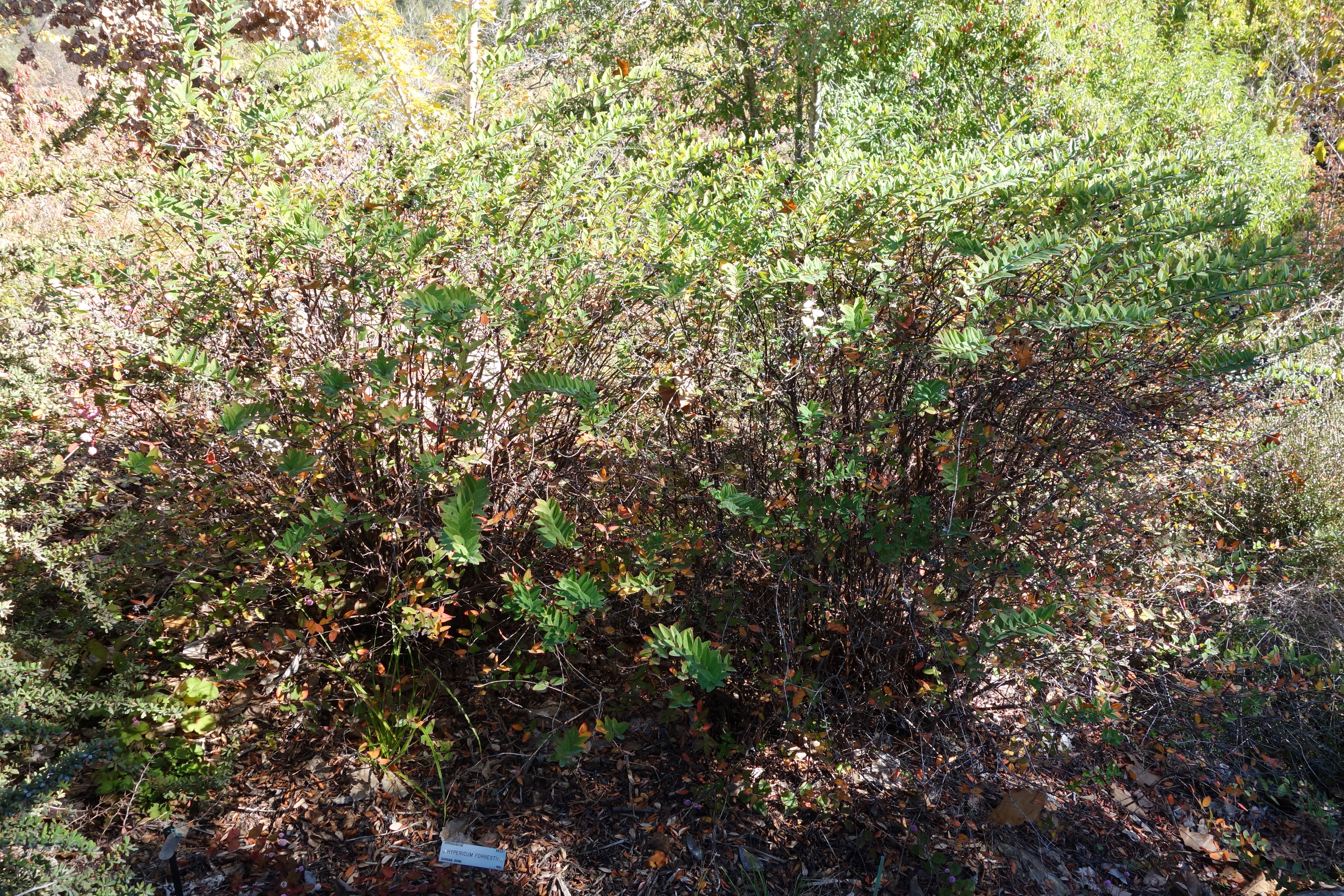

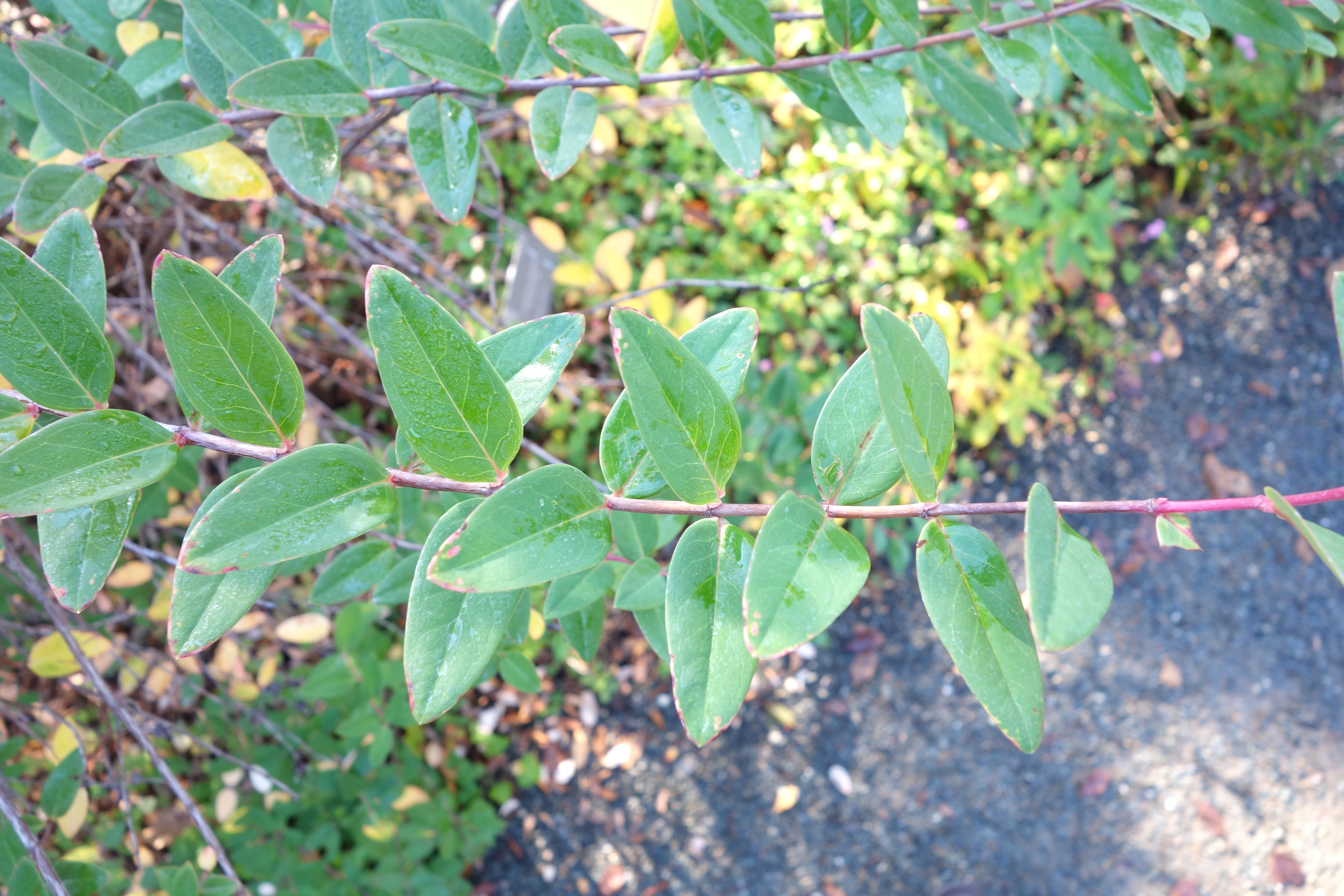

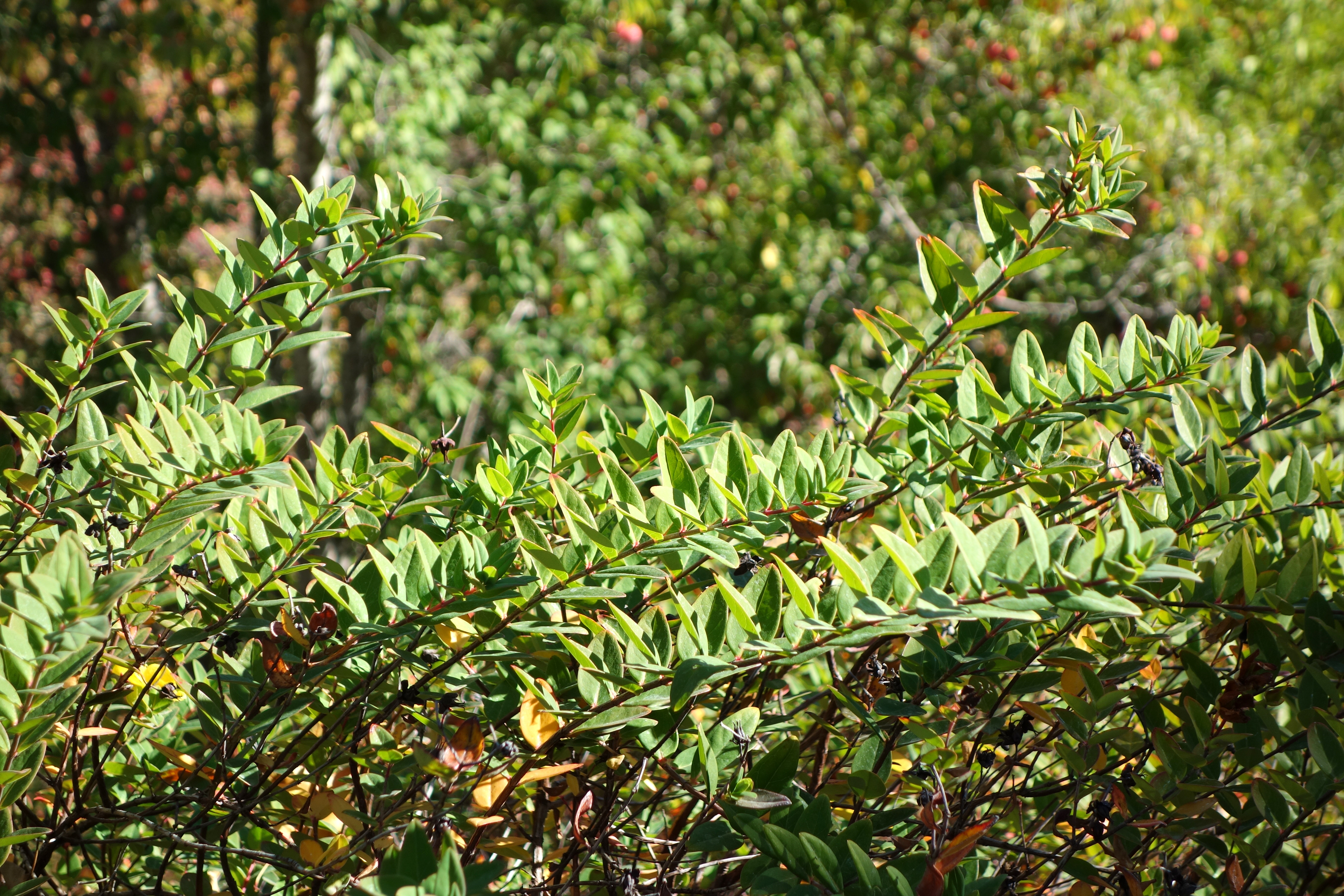
