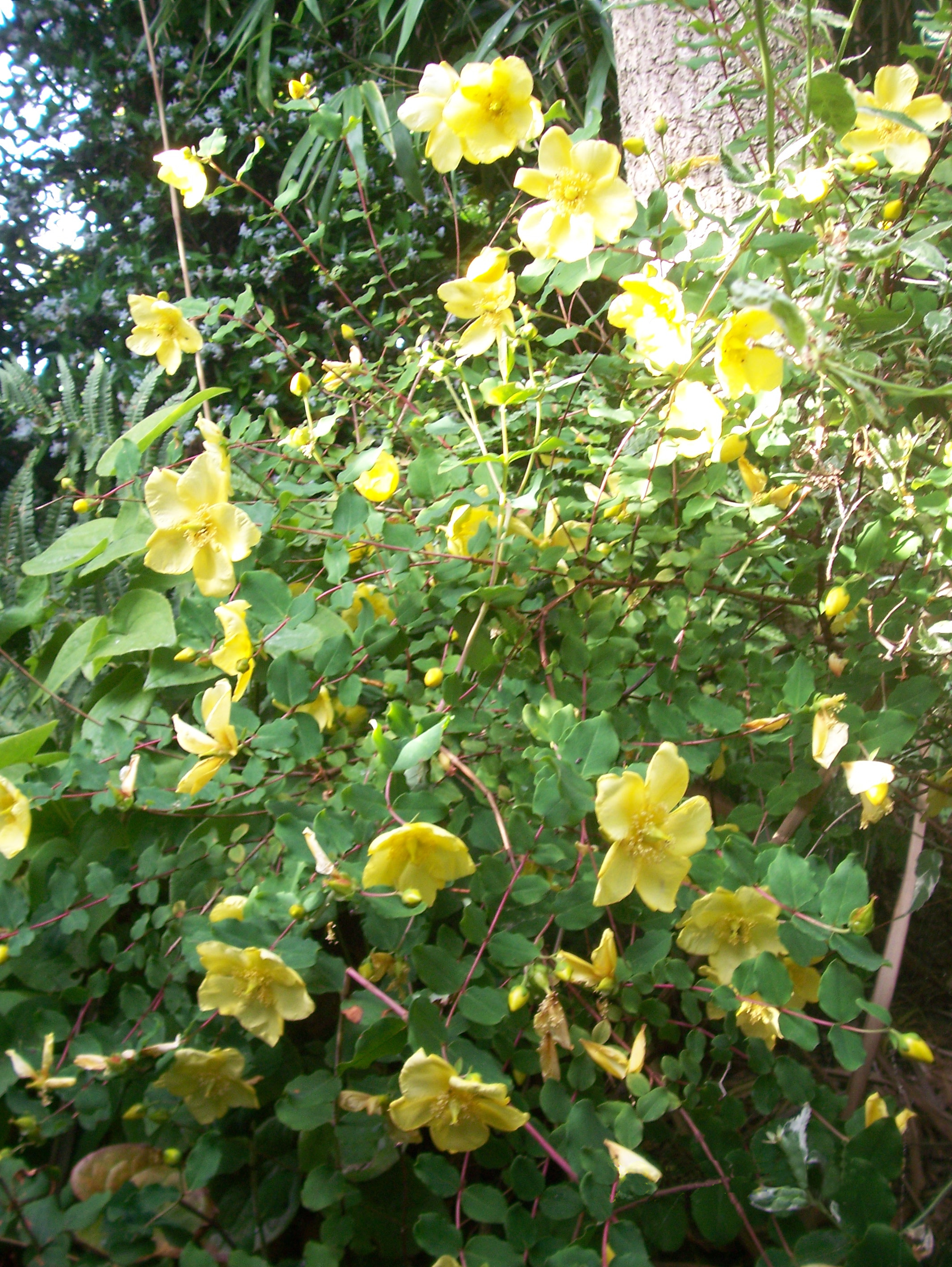

Scientific classification
- Kingdom: Plantae
- Clade: Tracheophytes
- Clade: Angiosperms
- Clade: Eudicots
- Clade: Rosids
- Order: Malpighiales
- Family: Hypericaceae
- Genus: Hypericum
- Section: H. sect. Ascyreia
- Species: H. bellum

Binomial name
- Hypericum bellum H.L.Li

= Hypericum bellum =

Species of flowering plant in the St John's wort family

Hypericum bellum is a species of flowering plant in the family Hypericaceae. It is a shrub known as mei li jin si tao in Chinese. It comes from the Sichuan, Xizang, and Yunnan regions of China, as well as India. It is a dense plant with downy leaves that grows up to a meter (39 inches) tall.
