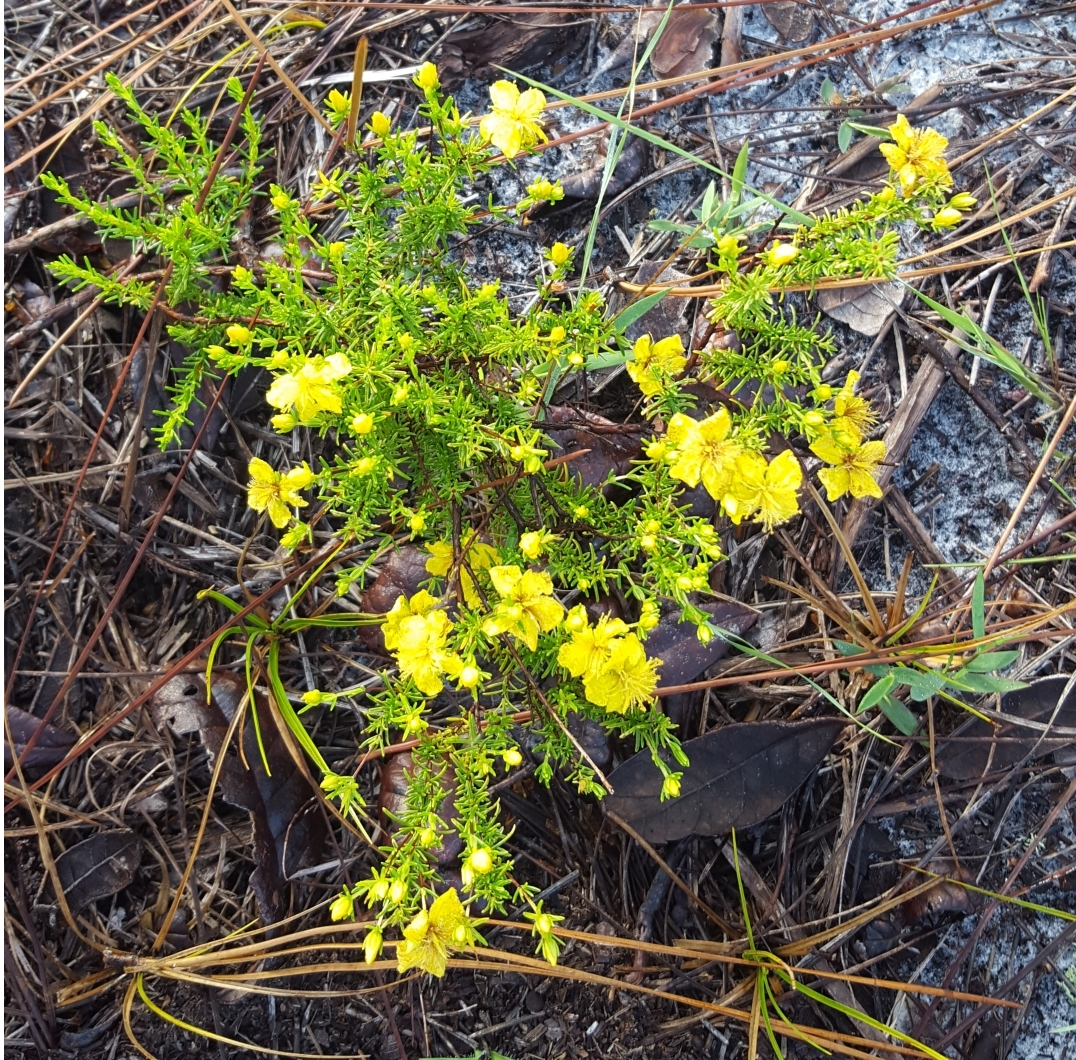

Conservation status
- Secure (NatureServe)

Scientific classification
- Kingdom: Plantae
- Clade: Tracheophytes
- Clade: Angiosperms
- Clade: Eudicots
- Clade: Rosids
- Order: Malpighiales
- Family: Hypericaceae
- Genus: Hypericum
- Section: H. sect. Myriandra
- Subsection: H. subsect. Centrosperma
- Species: H. tenuifolium

Binomial name
- Hypericum tenuifolium Pursh

Synonyms
- Hypericum coris Walter; Hypericum fasciculatum var. laxifolium Choisy; Hypericum galioides var. reductum Svenson; Hypericum reductum (Svenson) P.B.Adams

= Hypericum tenuifolium =

Species of flowering plant in the St John's wort family

Hypericum tenuifolium, known as Atlantic St. John's-wort and sandhill St. John's-wort, is a species of flowering plant in the St. John's wort family, Hypericaceae. It is endemic to the Southeastern United States.

== Description ==
Atlantic St. John's-wort is a small, spreading shrub, growing 10–50 cm (4–20 in) tall and forming mats. The leaves are very narrow, hence its name tenuifolium (from Latin tenuis 'thin' and folium 'leaf'), and are only 0.4–0.8 mm (0.016–0.031 in) broad and 4–11 mm (1/8–3/8 in) long, with rounded tips and revolute margins. The flowerheads are narrowly cylindric, producing 1–7 flowers. Each flower is 10–14 mm (3/8–1/2 in) broad with 5 sepals, 5 bright yellow petals, and 50–90 stamens. The ovaries are three-parted, forming cylindric capsule fruits. It flowers in the summer, typically June through September, but sometimes as late as December.

== Distribution and habitat ==
Hypericum tenuifolium occurs in the Atlantic coastal plain in the southeastern United States, in Alabama, Florida, Georgia, North Carolina, and South Carolina. Its habitat includes dry, open, sandy areas such as pine flatwoods, pine savannas, and sandhills.
