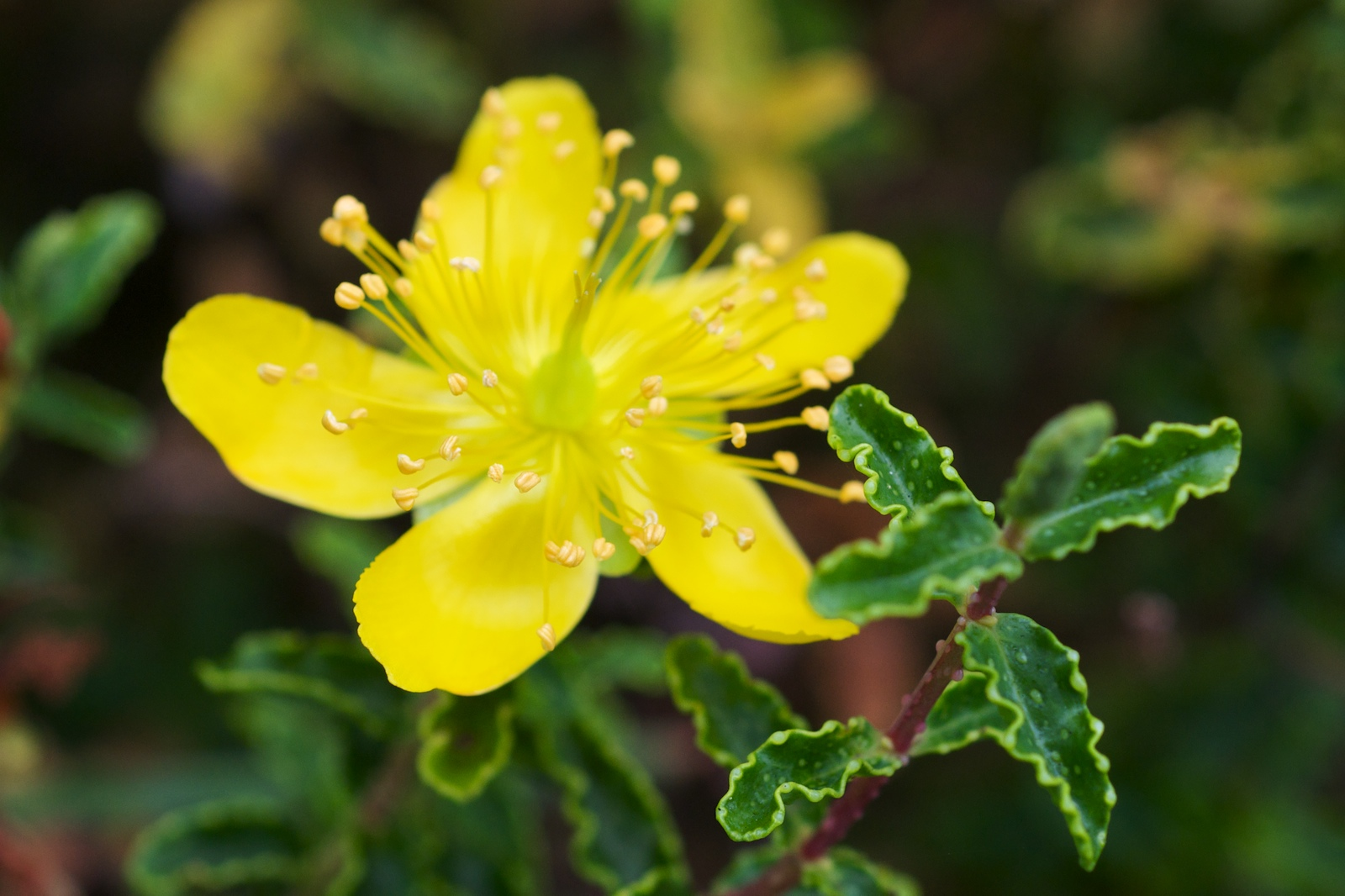
- Hypericum balearicum

Scientific classification
- Kingdom: Plantae
- Clade: Tracheophytes
- Clade: Angiosperms
- Clade: Eudicots
- Clade: Rosids
- Order: Malpighiales
- Family: Hypericaceae
- Genus: Hypericum
- Section: Hypericum sect. Psorophytum (Spach) Nyman
- Species: H. balearicum

Binomial name
- Hypericum balearicum L.

= Hypericum balearicum =

Species of flowering plant in the St John's wort family

Hypericum balearicum is a species of flowering plant in the family Hypericaceae, native to Spain's Balearic Islands. It is the only species in the section Psorophytum.

== Description ==
Hypericum balearicum is a shrub or small tree 0.6–2 m (2 ft 0 in – 6 ft 7 in) tall, usually forming a rounded bush with erect or ascending branches. Its stems are glandular and warty, yellow-green when young, becoming reddish-brown as it ages. The leaves are sessile, up to 15 mm (0.59 in) long and 7 mm (0.28 in) broad. The leaves have rounded tips, undulate margins, and broadly cuneate to rounded bases. They are leathery, with prominent warty glands, and paler underneath. The flowers are 15–40 mm (0.59–1.57 in) across with 5 golden yellow petals (rarely pale yellow), rounded sepals, with involucre-like bracts. The petals are oblong with rounded tips, 10–20 mm (0.39–0.79 in) long, and 4–9 mm (0.16–0.35 in) across.

Its warty stems and leaves and its involucre-like bracts distinguish it from other species of Hypericum.

== Distribution and habitat ==
H. balearicum is confined to the Balearic Islands (Mallorca, Menorca, Ibiza, Cabrera, and Dragonera). It is common on Mallorca but rare on the other islands. It has been introduced to Italy. It is found in dry woods and calcareous rocky habitats, from 30–1,200 m (98–3,937 ft).
