= Hypericum umbraculoides =

Scientific classification
- Kingdom: Plantae
- Clade: Tracheophytes
- Clade: Angiosperms
- Clade: Eudicots
- Clade: Rosids
- Order: Malpighiales
- Family: Hypericaceae
- Genus: Hypericum
- Section: Hypericum sect. Umbraculoides; N.Robson
- Species: H. umbraculoides

Binomial name
- Hypericum umbraculoides N.Robson

Species of flowering plant in the St John's wort family

Hypericum umbraculoides is a species of flowering plant, a deciduous shrub in the St. John's wort family, Hypericaceae. It is the sole species in the section Hypericum sect. Umbraculoides.

== Description ==
The stems of Hypericum umbraculoides are reddish and its bark is grey. The oblong, papery leaves are sessile, up to 50 mm (2.0 in) long and 30 mm (1.2 in) broad, and paler underneath. The flowers are up to 30 mm (1.2 in) across with 5 golden-yellow petals. Its growth rate and height are unknown.

== Distribution ==
Hypericum umbraculoides is known to be found only in Oaxaca, Mexico, in arid to semiarid climates.
