= Hypericum steyermarkii =

Scientific classification
- Kingdom: Plantae
- Clade: Tracheophytes
- Clade: Angiosperms
- Clade: Eudicots
- Clade: Rosids
- Order: Malpighiales
- Family: Hypericaceae
- Genus: Hypericum
- Section: Hypericum sect. Santomasia
- Species: H. steyermarkii

Binomial name
- Hypericum steyermarkii Standl. 1940

Synonyms
- Santomasia steyermarkii (Standl.) N.Robson

Species of flowering plant

Hypericum steyermarkii is a species of flowering plant in the genus Hypericum, and is the only species in Hypericum sect. Santomasia. The species is found in the Chiapas province of Mexico as well as in Guatemala. The species was named for the collector of its holotype, Julian Steyermark, an American botanist.
