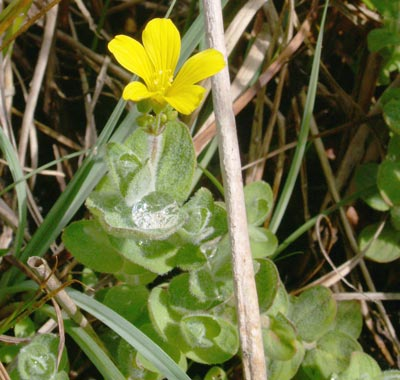

Conservation status
- Least Concern (IUCN 3.1)

Scientific classification
- Kingdom: Plantae
- Clade: Embryophytes
- Clade: Tracheophytes
- Clade: Angiosperms
- Clade: Eudicots
- Clade: Rosids
- Order: Malpighiales
- Family: Hypericaceae
- Genus: Hypericum
- Section: Hypericum sect. Tripentas (Casp.) N.Robson
- Species: H. elodes

Binomial name
- Hypericum elodes L.

Synonyms
- Elodes palustris; Hypericum palustre; Hypericum helodes

= Hypericum elodes =

Species of flowering plant in the St John's wort family

Hypericum elodes, commonly known as marsh St John's-wort, is a species of flowering plant in the St. John's wort family Hypericaceae. It is native to Western Europe.

== Description ==
Hypericum elodes is a greyish perennial that forms mats, whereas most other plants in the genus Hypericum stand upright. Roots grow from the nodes on its creeping stems. The opposite leaves are hairy, pale green, and rounded. The spikes each bear a few yellow flowers that smell like resin. The five sepals are downy, and the margins of the five petals are lined with red dots.

== Habitat ==
Hypericum elodes grows in acidic conditions on marshy ground, bog pools, and pond margins.

== Distribution ==
Hypericum elodes grows in Austria, Belgium, France, Germany, Great Britain, Ireland, Italy, the Netherlands, Portugal, and Spain. In Great Britain, it grows in the north and the west.
