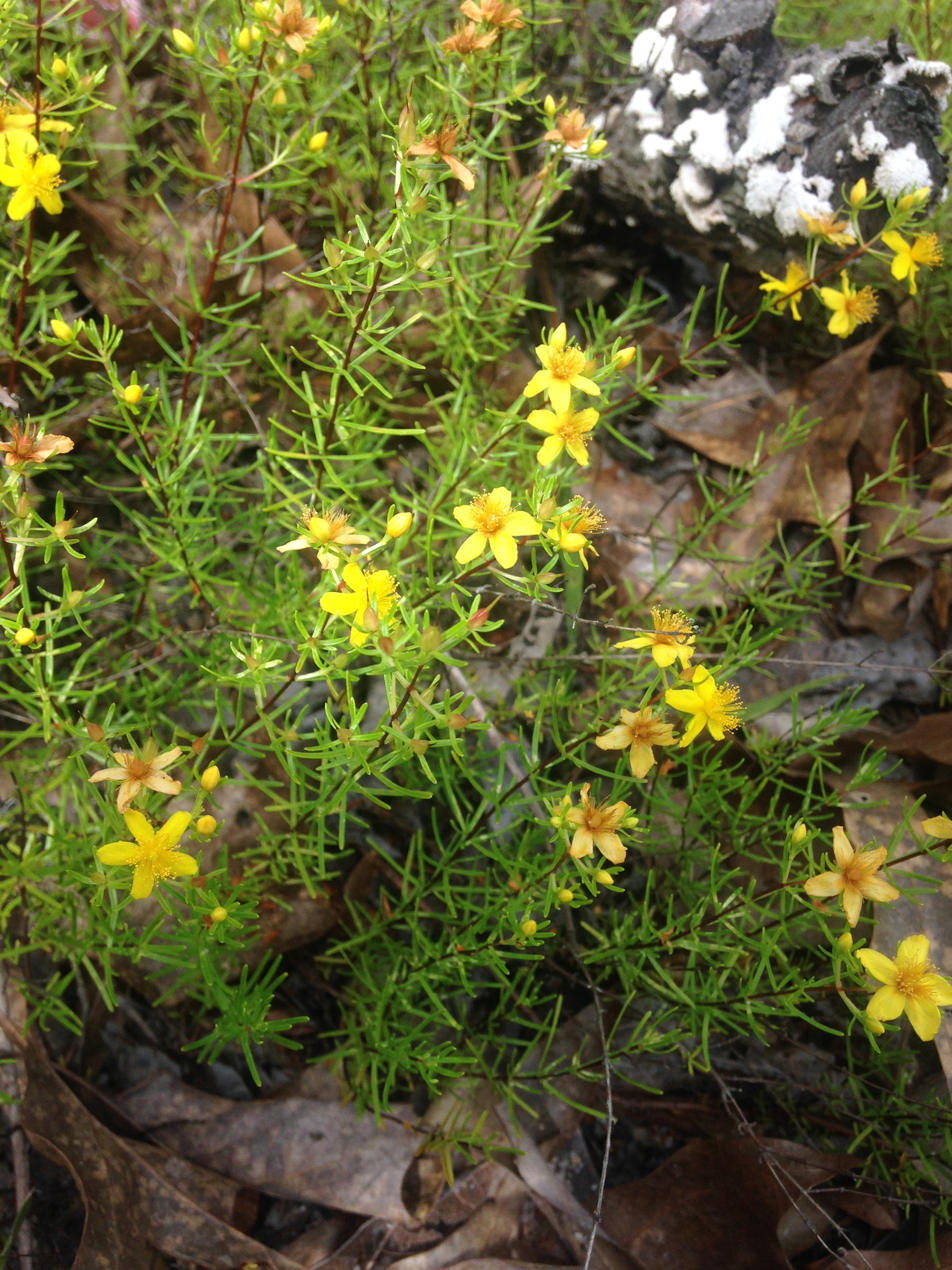

Scientific classification
- Kingdom: Plantae
- Clade: Tracheophytes
- Clade: Angiosperms
- Clade: Eudicots
- Clade: Rosids
- Order: Malpighiales
- Family: Hypericaceae
- Genus: Hypericum
- Species: H. lloydii

Binomial name
- Hypericum lloydii (Svenson) P.B.Adams

Synonyms
- Hypericum galioides var. lloydii Svenson

= Hypericum lloydii =

Species of flowering plant

Hypericum lloydii, known as Lloyd's St. John's-wort or sandhill St. John's wort, is a species of flowering plant in the St. John's wort family (Hypericaceae). It is native to the Southeastern United States where it is found primarily in the lower Piedmont and inner Coastal Plain. Its natural habitat is in dry open areas such as sandhills or granite flatrocks.

Hypericum lloydii is a low straggling mat-forming shrub. Its leaves are narrowly linear, reaching up to 25 mm (1 in) long. It produces relatively small yellow flowers, 12–14 mm (0.5–0.6 in) across, in the summer.
