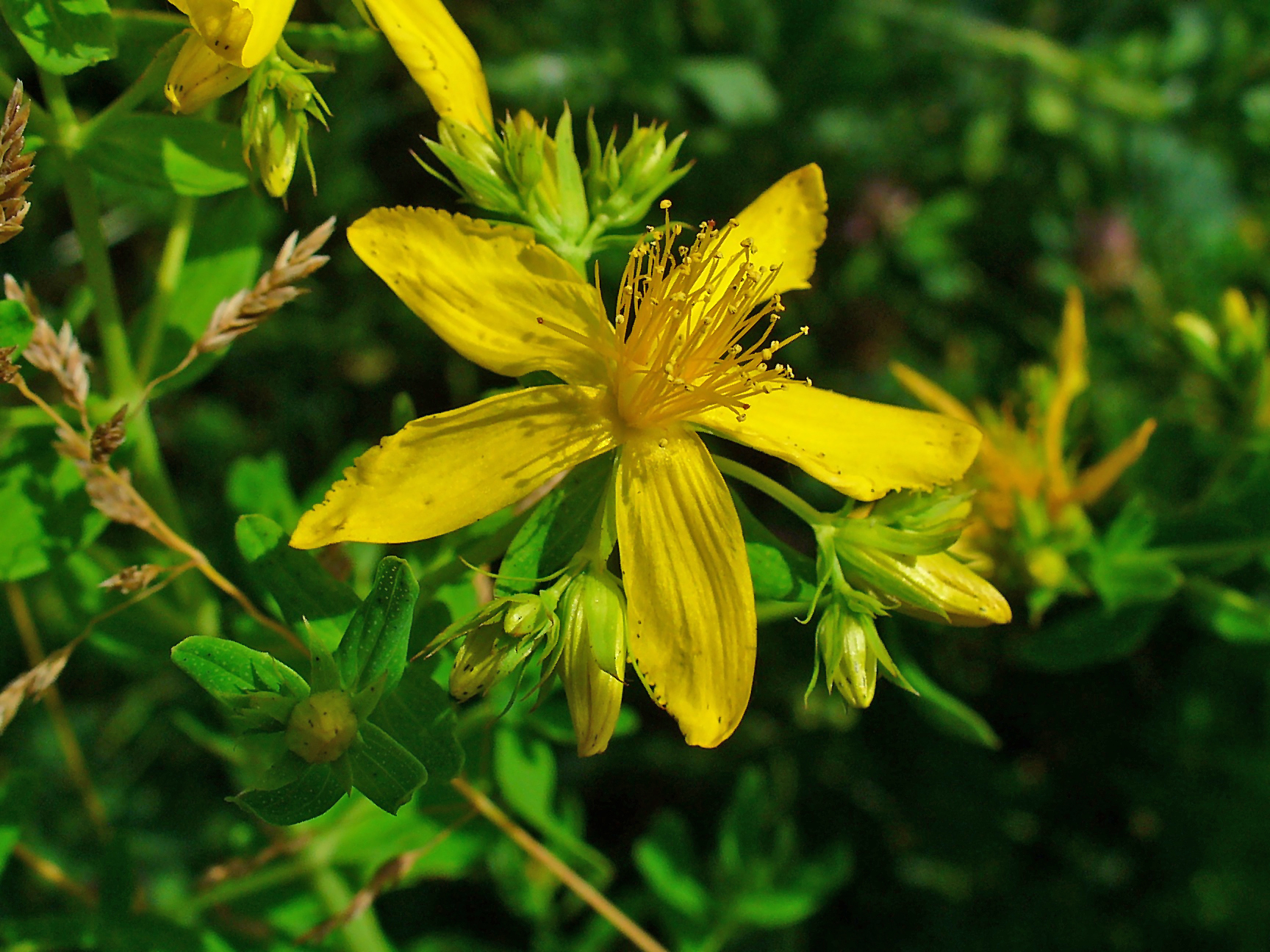
- Hypericum perforatum L.

Scientific classification
- Kingdom: Plantae
- Clade: Tracheophytes
- Clade: Angiosperms
- Clade: Eudicots
- Clade: Rosids
- Order: Malpighiales
- Family: Hypericaceae
- Tribe: Hypericeae; Choisy (1821)

Genera
- Hypericum L.

= Hypericeae =

Hypericeae Temporal range: Eocene - recent

Tribe of flowering plants

Hypericeae is a tribe of the Hypericaceae family that contains the genus Hypericum. It was first described by Jacques Choisy, a Swiss botanist, in 1821 in the 32nd issue of Prodr. Monogr. Hypėric. It was also later described by Adolf Engler in 1895 in the Prantl, Nat. Pflanzenfam.

== Description ==
The tribe contains herbs and shrubs, with several common characteristics. Their ovaries all have 3-5 lateral membrane placenta, and are either incomplete or with 3-5 locules. Their seeds lack wings, and their cotyledons are normally shorter than their hypocotyls.
