= Édouard Spach =

French botanist

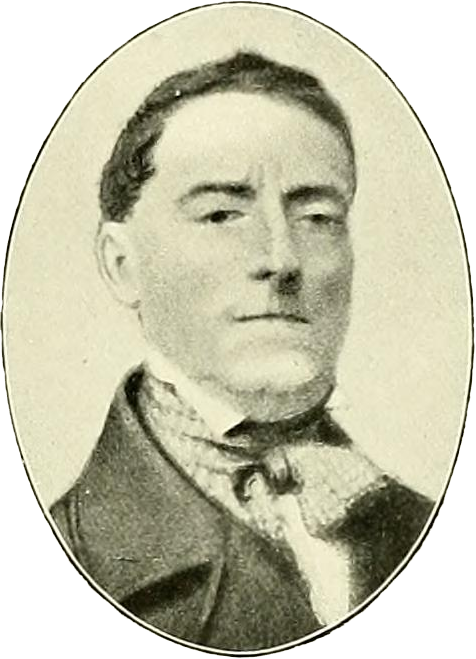
Édouard Spach

Édouard Spach (23 November 1801 – 18 May 1879) was a French botanist. The standard author abbreviation Spach is used to indicate this person as the author when citing a botanical name.

The son of a merchant in Strasbourg, in 1824 he went to Paris, where he studied botany with René Desfontaines (1750–1831) and Antoine-Laurent de Jussieu (1748–1836). He then became the secretary of Charles-François Brisseau de Mirbel (1776–1854). When de Mirbel became a professor at the Muséum national d'histoire naturelle (National Museum of Natural History), he followed him and remained at the museum for the remainder of his career.

He published many monographs, including Histoire naturelle des végétaux. Phanérogames ("Natural history of plants: Spermatophytes"; fourteen volumes and an atlas, Roret, Paris, 1834–1848), and with Hippolyte François Jaubert (1798–1874), Illustrationes plantarum orientalium ("Illustrations of plants of the East"; five volumes, Roret, Paris, 1842–1857).

The genus Spachea was named after him by Adrien-Henri de Jussieu (now considered synonymous with Fuchsia).
