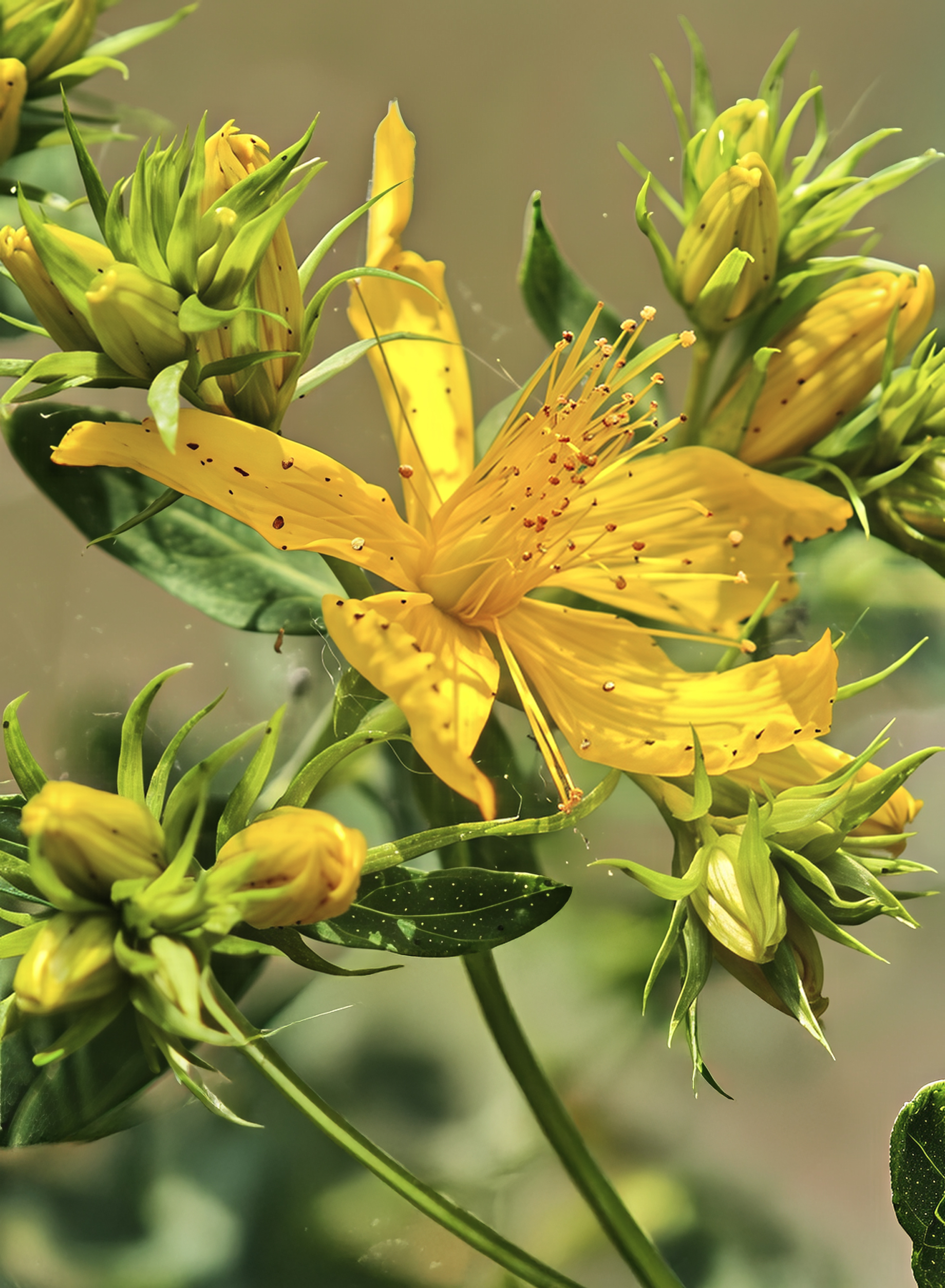
- Hypericum perforatum

Scientific classification
- Kingdom: Plantae
- Clade: Tracheophytes
- Clade: Angiosperms
- Clade: Eudicots
- Clade: Rosids
- Order: Malpighiales
- Family: Hypericaceae
- Tribe: Hypericeae
- Genus: Hypericum; Tourn. ex L.

Species
- c. 518

Synonyms
- List: Adenosepalum Fourr.; Adenotrias Jaub. & Spach; Androsaemum Duhamel; Androsemum Link; Ascyrum L.; Brathydium Spach; Brathys Mutis ex L.f.; Campylopus Spach; Campylosporus Spach; Crookea Small; Drosanthe Spach; Drosocarpium Fourr.; Elodea Juss.; Elodes Adans.; Episiphis Raf.; Eremanthe Spach; Eremosporus Spach; Holosepalum Fourr.; Hypericoides Plum. ex Adans.; Hypericon J.F.Gmel.; Hypericopsis Opiz; Isophyllum Spach; Knifa Adans.; Kniffa Vent.; Komana Adans.; Lianthus N.Robson; Martia Spreng.; Myriandra Spach; Norysca Spach; Olympia Spach; Pancalum Ehrh.; Petalanisia Raf.; Pleurenodon Raf.; Psorophytum Spach; Receveura Vell.; Roscyna Spach; Sanidophyllum Small; Santomasia N.Robson; Sarothra L.; Spachelodes Y.Kimura; Streptalon Raf.; Takasagoya Y.Kimura; Thornea Breedlove & E.M.McClint.; Thymopsis Jaub. & Spach; Triadenia Spach; Triadenum Raf.; Tridia Korth.; Tripentas Casp.; Webbia Spach

= Hypericum =

Hypericum Temporal range: Eocene - recent

Genus of flowering plants known as St. John's worts

Hypericum /ˌhaɪˈpiːrɪkəm/ is a genus of flowering plants in the family Hypericaceae (formerly considered a subfamily of Clusiaceae). The genus has a nearly worldwide distribution, missing only from tropical lowlands, deserts and polar regions. Many Hypericum species are regarded as invasive species and noxious weeds. All members of the genus may be referred to as St. John's wort, and some are known as goatweed. The white or pink flowered marsh St. John's worts of North America and eastern Asia are generally accepted as belonging to the separate genus Triadenum Raf.

Hypericum is unusual for a genus of its size because a worldwide taxonomic monograph was produced for it by Norman Robson (working at the Natural History Museum, London). Robson recognizes 36 sections within Hypericum.

== Description ==
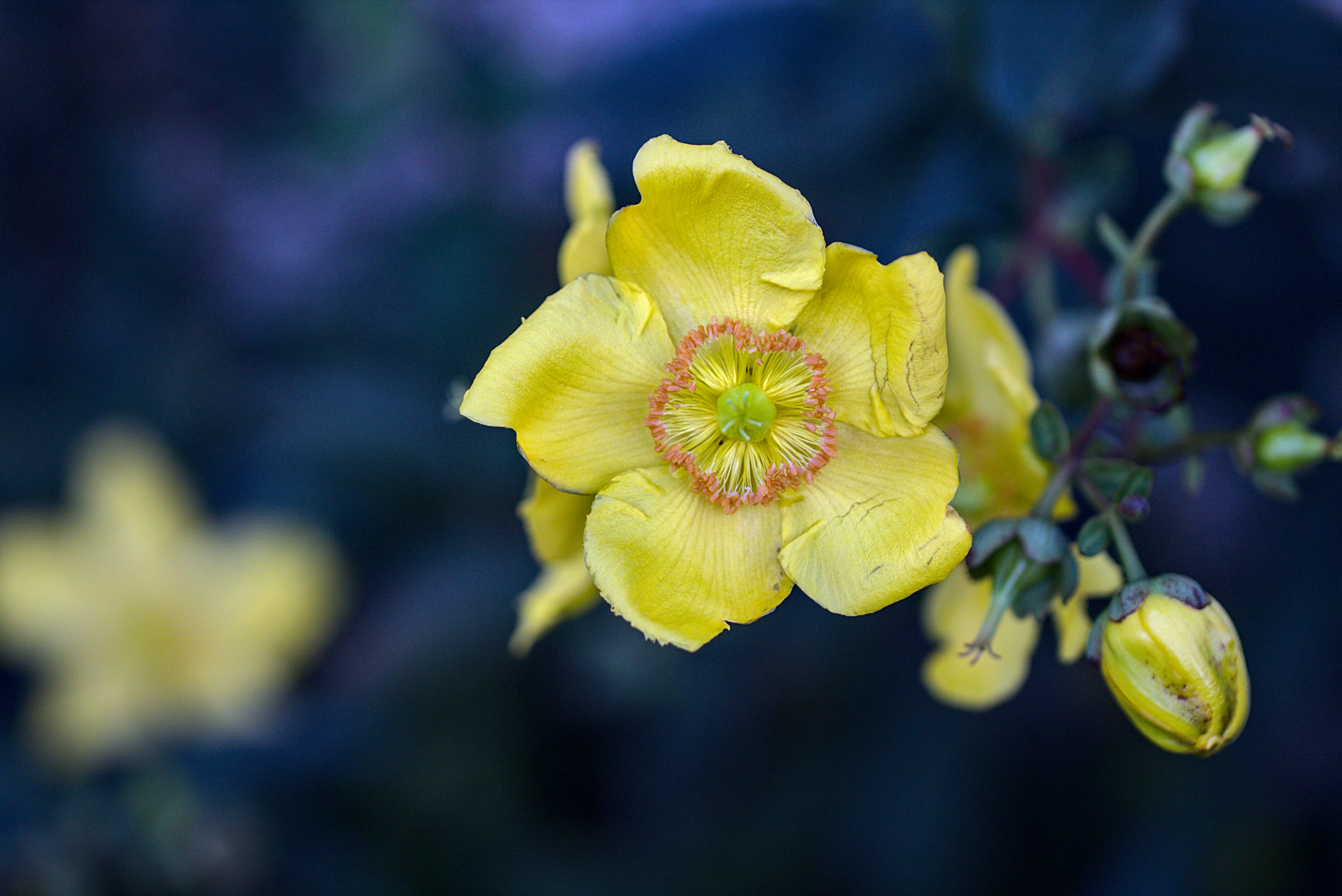
Hypericum hidcoteense

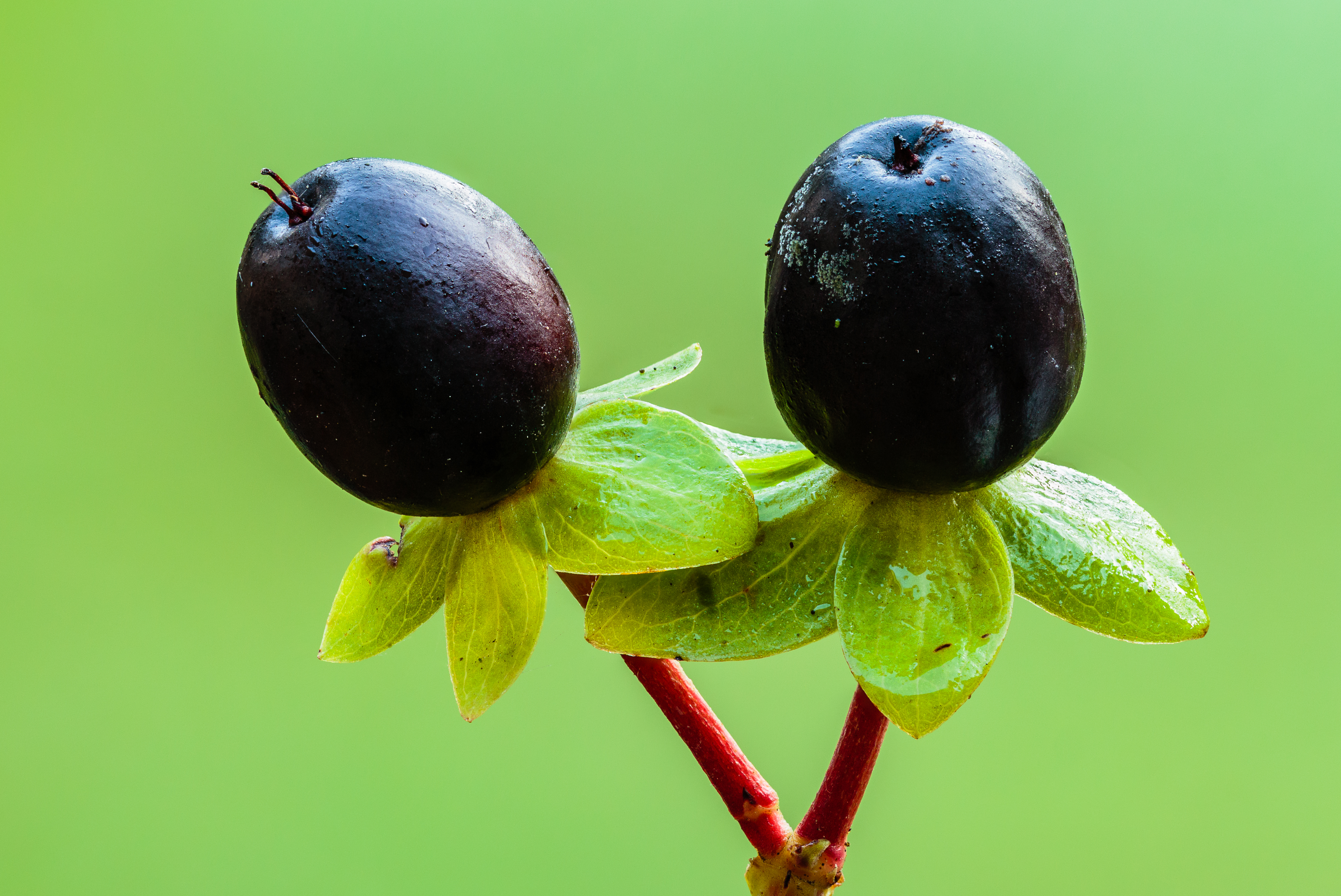
Ripe berries of Hypericum androsaemum

Hypericum species are quite variable in habit, occurring as trees, shrubs, annuals, and perennials. Trees in the sense of single stemmed woody plants are rare, as most woody species have multiple stems arising from a single base. Shrubs have erect or spreading stems but never root from nodes that touch the ground. However, perennial herbs tend to root from these horizontal nodes, especially those that occur in wet habitats. Annual herbs tend to have taproots with a developed system of secondary hair roots. Many species of Hypericum are completely glabrous, others have simple uniseriate hairs, and some species have long, fine hairs.

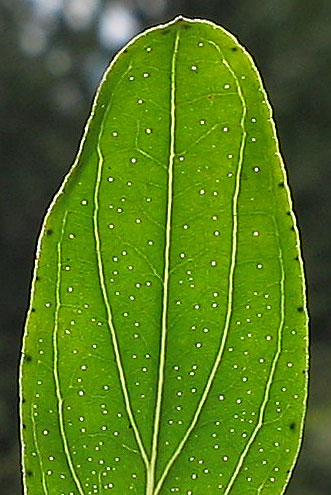
Glandular dots on a leaf of Hypericum perforatum

Two types of glands form the characteristic punctiform (dots) patterns of Hypericum, "dark glands" and "pale glands". Dark glands consist of clusters of cells with a distinct black to reddish color. Their hue is indicative of a presence of naphthodianthrone, either hypericin or pseudohypericin, or both. These glands occur in about two-thirds of Hypericum sections and are usually restricted to certain organs. When these glands are crushed, the naphthodianthrones give a red stain. Paracelsus called the red secretions "Johannes-blut" in the 16th century, linking the plant to the martyr St. John and giving rise to the English and German common names of "St. John's wort". The pale glands, forming the pellucid dots, are each a schizogenous intracellular space lined with flattened cells that secrete oils and phloroglucinol derivates, including hyperforin. The distribution of these hypericin glands dissuades generalist herbivores from feeding on the plants. When generalist insects feed on Hypericum perforatum, 30-100% more naphthodianthrones are produced, repelling the insects.

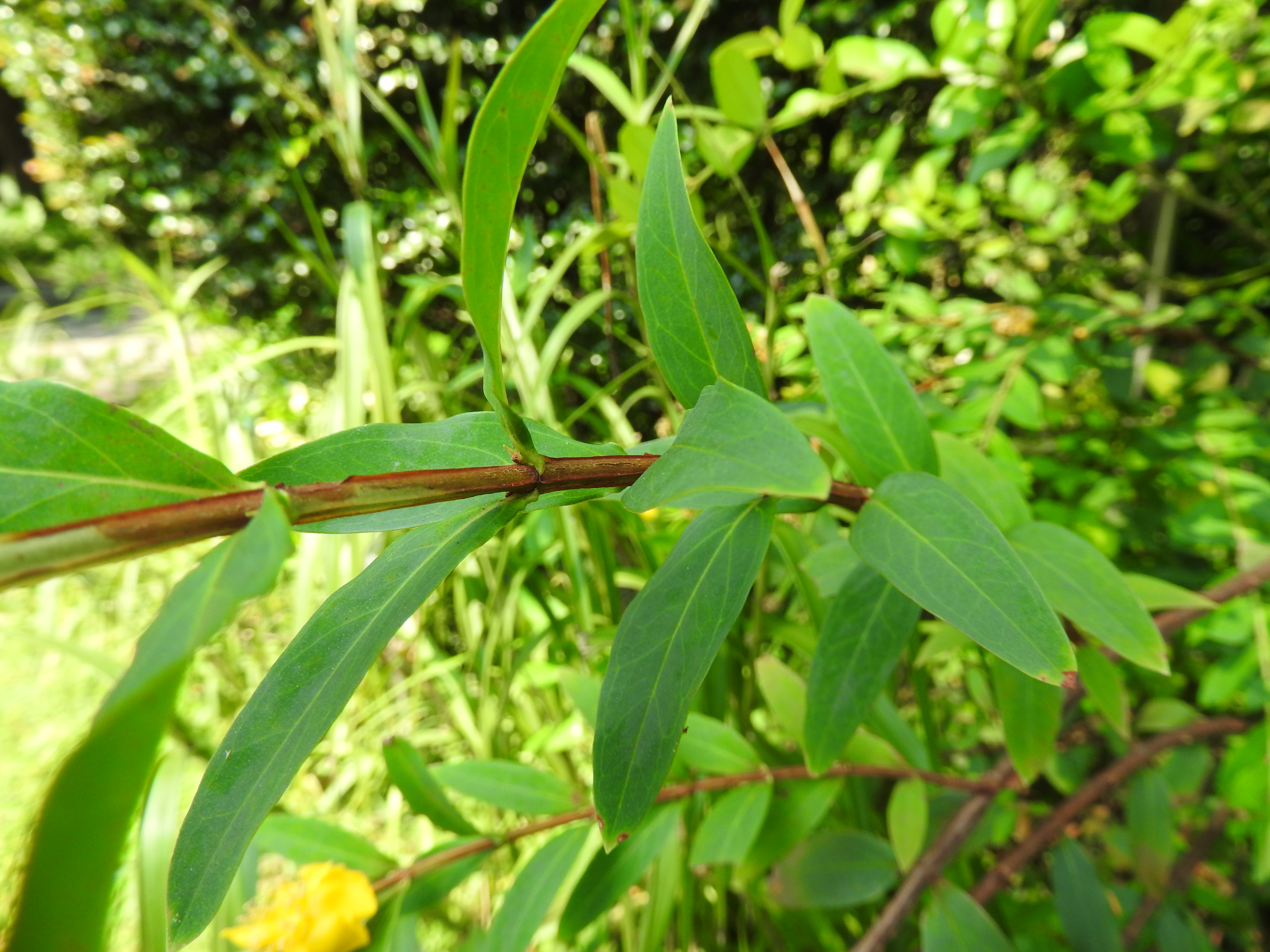
The four-lined stem of Hypericum subalatum

The four thin ridges of tissue along the stems are closely to the opposite-decussate leaves of Hypericum. The ridges can be minor, just being called "ridges", or prominent, being called "wings". Terete, two-lined, and six-lined stems can occur occasionally. When a species has a tree or shrub habit, the internodes become mostly terete with age, though some trace of lines can still be detected in mature plants. The number of lines is an important distinguishing characteristic; for example, H. perforatum and Hypericum maculatum are easily confused save for H. perforatum having two lines and H. maculatum having four. The pale and dark glands are present on stems of various species, and other various species have stems without any glands. In section Hypericum, the glands are only present on stem lines, and in other sections, including Origanifolia and Hirtella, the glands are distributed across the stems.

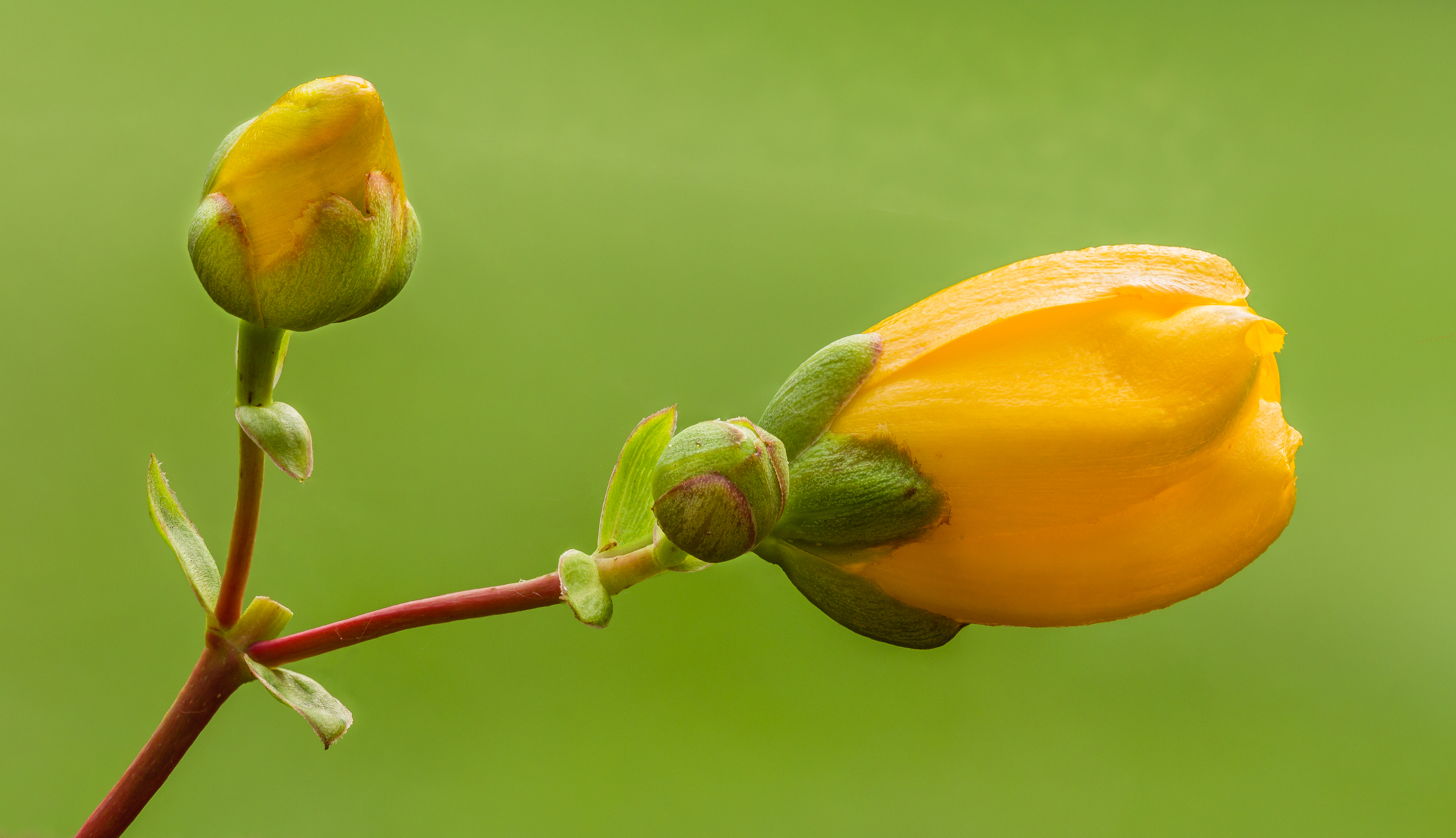
Three flower buds of a hypericum (Hypericum) in different stages of development.

Nearly all leaves of Hypericum species are arranged opposite and decussate, an exception being section Coridium in which whorls of three to four leaves occur. The leaves lack stipules and can be sessile or shortly petiolar, though long petioles exist in sections Adenosepalum and Hypericum. Basal articulation can be present, in which case leaves are deciduous above the articulation, or absent, in which case the leaves are persistent. Some species in sections Campylosporus and Brathys have an auricle-like, reflexed leaf base, whereas true auricles only exist in sections Drosocarpium, Thasia, and Crossophyllum. Laminar venation is highly variable, being dichotomous to pinnate to densely reticulate. Leaves are typically ovoid to elongate to linear in shape. Leaves are typically shorter than the internodes. Pale or dark glands can be present on or near the leaf margin and on the main leaf surface.

Typically, there are four or five sepals, though in section Myriandra there are rarely three. When five sepals are present they are quincuncial, and when four sepals are present they are opposite and decussate. Sepals can be equal or unequal. Sepals can be united at their base, as seen in sections Hirtella, Taeniocarpium, and Arthrophyllum. The margins are variable, having marginal glands, teeth, or hairs. The presence or absence of dark glands on the sepals is a useful distinguishing characteristic.

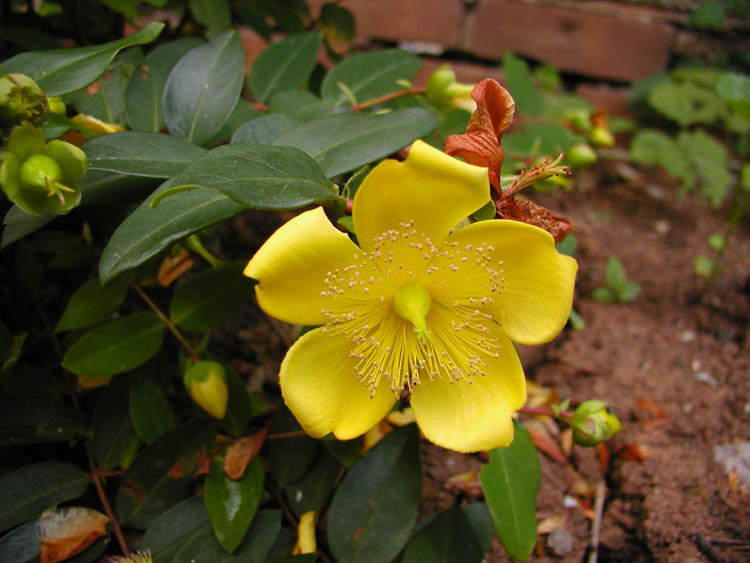
Yellow petals of Hypericum x hidcoteense 'Hidcote'

Almost all Hypericum petals are yellow, though a range of color exists from a pale lemony hue to a deep orangish-yellow. Exceptions include the white or pinkish petals of Hypericum albiflorum var. albiflorum and H. geminiflorum. Many species have petals that are lined or tinged with red, including the deep crimson petals of H. capitatum var. capitatum. Petal lengths can be equal or unequal. The petals are mostly asymmetrical except those of sections Adenotrias and Elodes. In those two sections, sterile bodies have developed between the stamen fascicles, working as lodicules to spread the petals of the pseudotubular flower, a specialized pollination mechanism. Nearly all species have glands on their petals; only section Adenotrias has completely eglandular petals. It has been hypothesized that the intensity of red on the petals is correlated with the hypericin content of the glands, but other pigments including skyrin derivatives can create a red color.

Hypericum flowers have four or five fascicles that have, in total, five to two hundred stamens. The fascicles can be free or fused in various ways, often into three apparent fascicles. In sections Myriandra, Brathys, and some of Trigynobrathys, the stamens form a ring. Though stamens are usually persistent, some are deciduous. The stamens have an anther gland on the connective tissue, varying in color from amber to black.

The ovaries are three or five-merous, occasionally two-merous, with a corresponding number of free or united styles. Developing seeds are borne on axile or parietal placentae, with at least two ovules per placenta. Hypericum fruits are dissimilar to most of Hypericaceae, being capsular and dehisce from the apex. The capsule can be dry or remain fleshy when mature. The capsules have elongate or punctate glands on their surface that create various shapes and patterns. These glands are typically pale amber, though in section Drosocarpium the glands are reddish-black. Extractions of these glands in certain species yielded phloroglucinol and terpenoid derivatives, suggesting a connection between these glands and the pale glands of vegetative tissue. Seeds of Hypericum species are small and range in color from a yellowish brown to dark purplish brown. The seeds are cylindric to ellipsoid and may have narrow wings. In some seeds, a basal ridge may be present, and rarely in section Adenotrias an apical caruncle is present which attracts ants to disperse seeds. Some species have highly specific germination and survival condition requirements. For example, H. lloydii is susceptible to a fungal infection as a seedling if conditions are too moist, whereas other species including H. chapmanii can grow underwater.

== Taxonomy ==
There are over 490 species in the genus. The name hypericum derives from ὑπέρεικος hypereikos (variants: ὑπέρεικον hypereikon and ὑπερικόν hyperikon), i.e. the Greek name for Hypericum crispum and Hypericum revolutum, itself possibly meaning "above pictures", for its use over shrines to repel evil spirits, though some have translated it as "above the heath".

=== Sections ===
Hypericum is broken up into 36 sections, each with its own subsections and species. They include:

- Adenosepalum
- Adenotrias
- Androsaemum
- Arthrophyllum
- Ascyreia
- Brathys
- Bupleuroides
- Campylopus
- Concinna
- Coridium
- Crossophyllum
- Drosocarpium
- Elodeoida
- Graveolentia
- Heterophylla
- Hirtella
- Humifusoideum
- Hypericum
- Inodora
- Monanthama
- Myriandra
- Oligostema
- Olympia
- Origanifolia
- Psorophytum
- Roscyna
- Sampsonia
- Santomasia
- Taeniocarpium
- Takasagoya
- Triadenoides
- Trigynobrathys
- Tripentas
- Umbraculoides
- Webbia

== Ecology ==
H. perforatum is an invasive species and noxious weed in farmland and gardens in the humid and sub-humid temperate zones of several continents. It is considered poisonous to livestock.

Part of the invasive success of Hypericum species is due to the absence of natural pests. The beetles Chrysolina quadrigemina, Chrysolina hyperici and the St. John's-wort root borer (Agrilus hyperici) feed on common St. John's-wort (H. perforatum) plants and have been used for biocontrol where the plant has become an invasive weed. Hypericum species are the only known food plants of the caterpillar of the treble-bar, a species of moth. Other Lepidoptera species whose larvae sometimes feed on Hypericum include the common emerald, the engrailed (recorded on imperforate St. John's-wort, H. maculatum), the grey pug and the setaceous Hebrew character. A leaf beetle, Paria sellata, feeds on the foliage of Hypericum adpressum, while ant species Formica montana and F. subsericea decorate their nests with its bright yellow petals. A small, reddish-brown weevil, Anthonomous rutilus breeds in the inflorescences of Hypericum kalmianum and H. swinkianum, the larvae developing within the fruit capsules.

== Traditional medicine and adverse effects ==
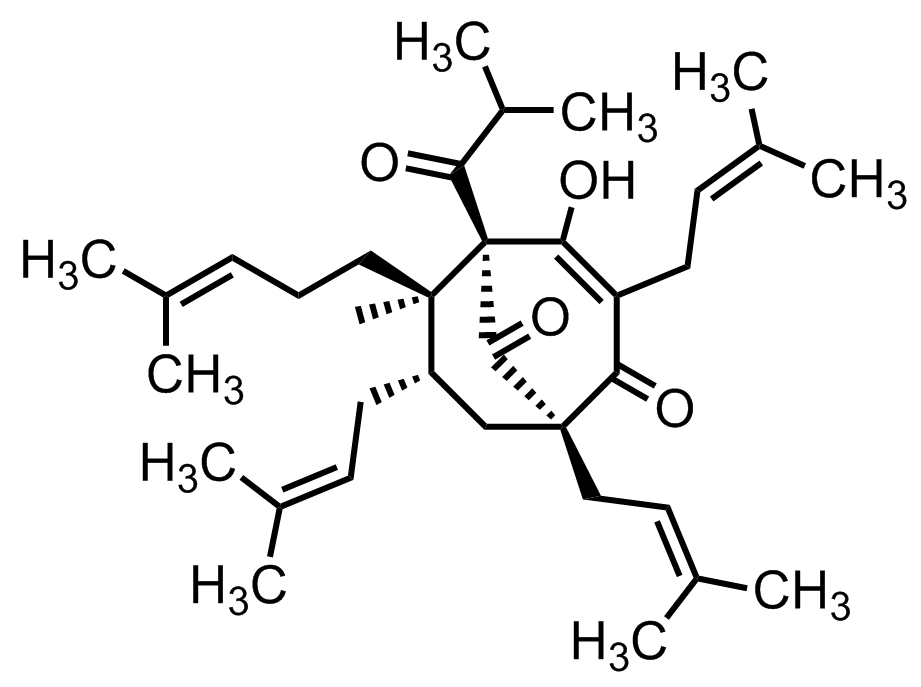
Hyperforin (left) and Hypericin (right)

Common St. John's-wort (H. perforatum) has long been used in traditional medicine as an extract to treat depression. H. perforatum is the most commonly used species – especially in Europe – as an herbal substitute for prescription drugs to treat depression, and is also sold as a dietary supplement. One meta-analysis found that St John's wort had similar efficacy and safety as prescriptions drugs to treat mild-to-moderate depression, such as selective serotonin reuptake inhibitors.

There is evidence that combining St. John’s wort with prescription antidepressants may cause adverse effects, such as a life-threatening increase of serotonin, the brain chemical targeted by some drugs used for depression. Symptoms may include agitation, diarrhea, high blood pressure, and hallucinations. Taking St. John’s wort may interfere with and reduce the efficacy of prescription drugs used to treat depression.

St. John's wort interacts with hormonal contraceptives, reducing their effectiveness and increasing the risk of unplanned pregnancy.

== Ornamental plants ==
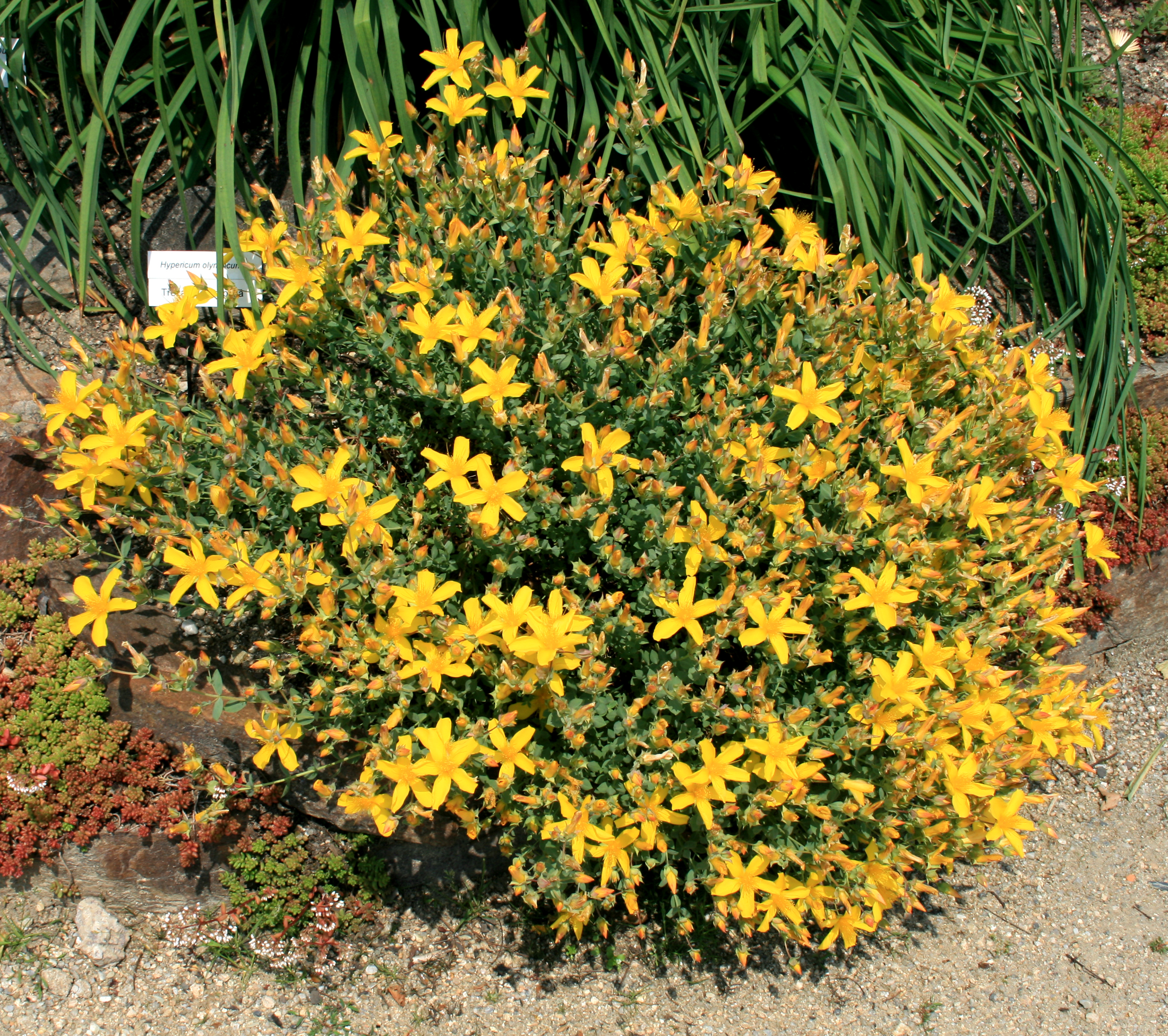
Hypericum olympicum in Botanic garden Liberec

Some species are used as ornamental plants as many have large, showy flowers. Species found in cultivation include:

- H. aegypticum
- H. androsaemum
- H. balearicum
- H. bellum
- H. calycinum
- H. elodes
- H. forrestii
- H. kalmianum
- H. kouytchense
- H. olympicum
- H. perforatum

Numerous hybrids and cultivars have been developed for use in horticulture. The following have gained the Royal Horticultural Society's Award of Garden Merit:

- H. × moserianum (H. calycinum × H. patulum)
- 'Hidcote'
- 'Rowallane'

Most species of Hypericum are prone to thrips, scale, anthracnose, rust, and leaf spots. They are also eaten or infected by aphids, white flies, and spodoptera littoralis.

== Fossil record ==
The oldest fossil species is †Hypericum antiquum from the Eocene of Siberia. Fossil seeds from the early Miocene of †Hypericum septestum have been found in the Czech part of the Zittau Basin. Many fossil seeds of †Hypericum holyi have been described from middle Miocene strata of the Fasterholt area near Silkeborg in Central Jutland, Denmark.
