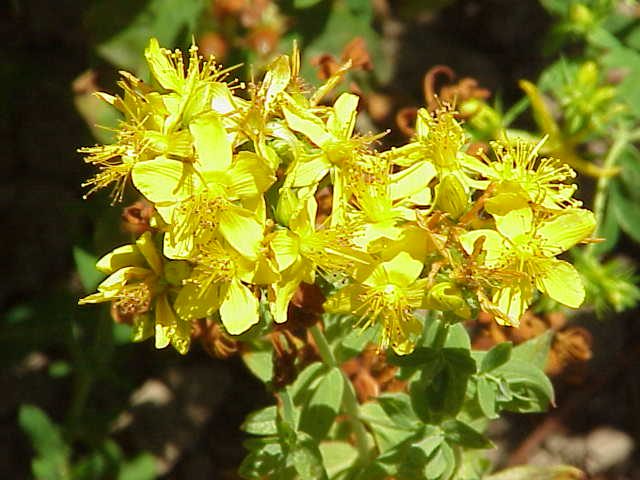
- Hypericum tetrapterum

Scientific classification
- Kingdom: Plantae
- Clade: Embryophytes
- Clade: Tracheophytes
- Clade: Spermatophytes
- Clade: Angiosperms
- Clade: Eudicots
- Clade: Rosids
- Order: Malpighiales
- Family: Hypericaceae; Juss.

Genera
- Cratoxylum Blume; Eliea Cambess.; Harungana Lam.; Hypericum Tourn. ex L.; Psorospermum Spach; Vismia Vand.

= Hypericaceae =

Hypericaceae Temporal range: Eocene–recent Possible Late Cretaceous record

Family of flowering plants (St. John's wort family)

Hypericaceae is a plant family in the order Malpighiales, comprising six to nine genera and up to 700 species, and commonly known as the St. John's wort family. Members are found throughout the world apart from extremely cold or dry habitats. Hypericum and Triadenum occur in temperate regions but other genera are mostly tropical.

== Characteristics ==
Members of this family are annual or perennial herbs, subshrubs or shrubs. The leaves are simple and entire, in opposite pairs; they are sometimes dotted with black or translucent glandular spots. The inflorescence consists of a branched, flat-topped cluster, each flower being radially symmetrical, with a superior ovary. Flowers have the following components: sepals, four or five, which tend to persist; petals four or five, usually yellow, sometimes dotted with black specks; stamens many, on long filaments; styles, three to five, often fused at the base. The fruit has a dehiscent capsule which splits open when ripe to release the fine black seed.

== Taxonomy ==
At one time, this family was accepted as a subfamily of the family Clusiaceae. Now it has been elevated to full family status. In Phytotaxa, six genera and around 590 species are listed, and Plants of the World Online recognises six genera and around 700 species. Members of the family are found worldwide except in excessively cold or dry areas. Most of the genera are mainly tropical, but Hypericum and Triadenum are found in temperate regions. Molecular data supports the monophyly of Hypericaceae.

When accepted as a complete family, the cladogram of Hypericaceae would appear as such:

- Hypericaceae
  - - Cratoxyleae
      - Cratoxylum
      - Eliea
  - - Hypericeae
      - Hypericum
  - - Vismieae
      - Harungana
      - Psorospermum
      - Vismia

== Pharmacology ==
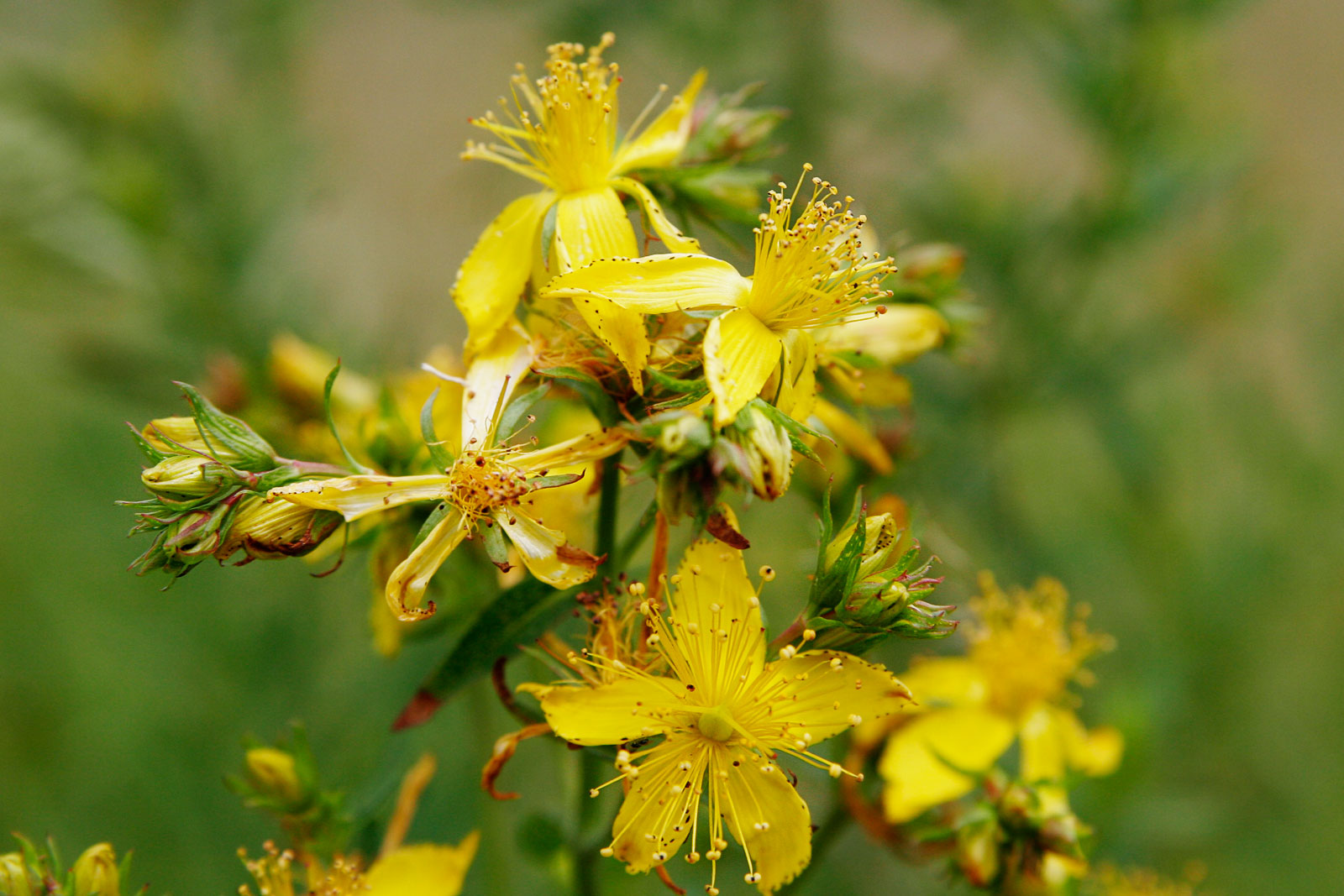
Common St. John's wort

Many members of this family contain the naphthodianthrone derivatives hypericin and pseudohypericin; these are contained in glandular tissues that appear as black, orange or translucent spots or lines on petals, leaves and other parts of the plant. These compounds are photosensitive and can cause reactions in grazing animals, such as blistering of the muzzle, as well as in people who come into contact with the plants over prolonged periods. The highest concentration of these substances occurs in common St. John's wort (Hypericum perforatum), which is used in herbalism and as a folk remedy.
