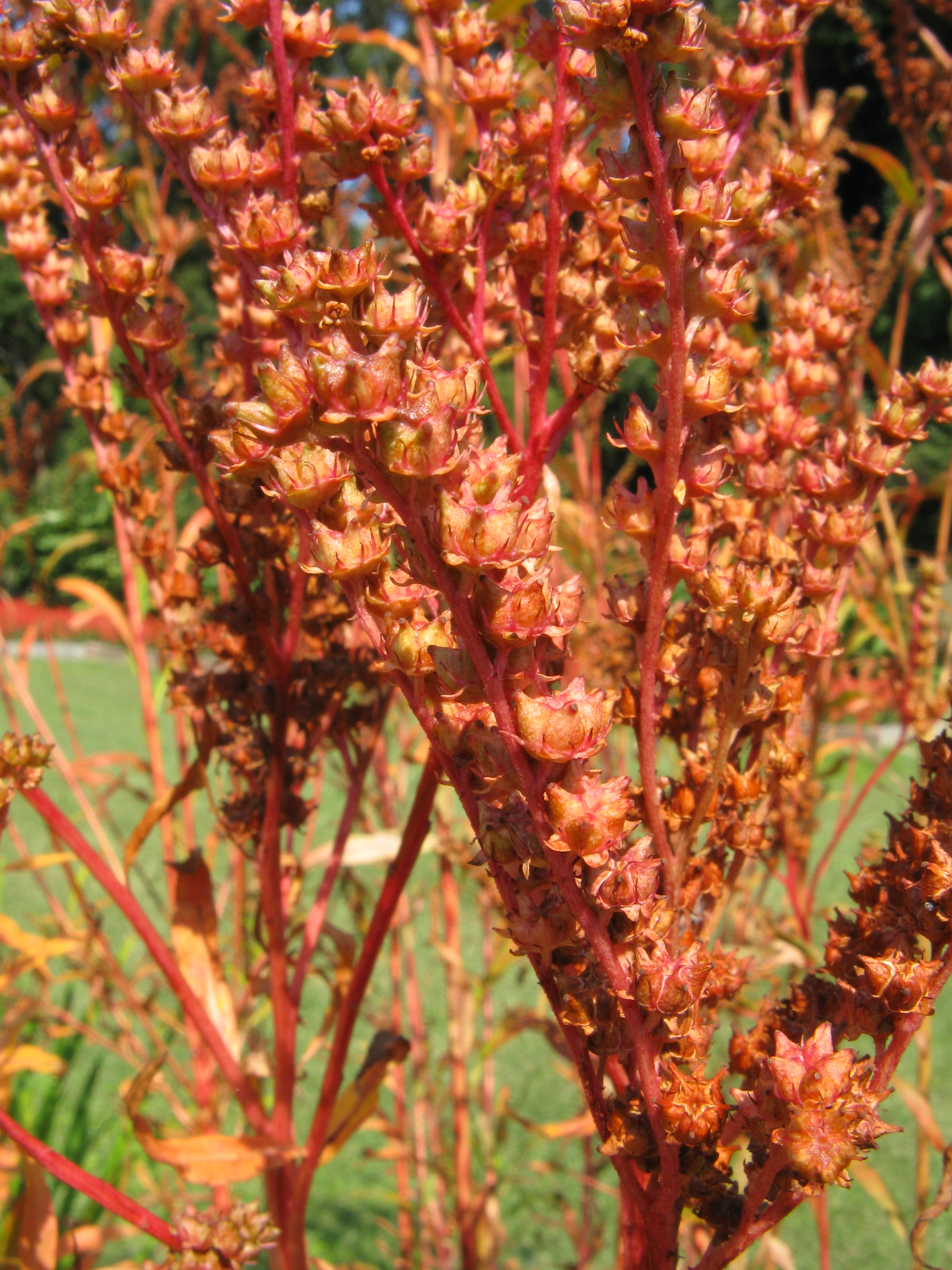

Scientific classification
- Kingdom: Plantae
- Clade: Embryophytes
- Clade: Tracheophytes
- Clade: Angiosperms
- Clade: Eudicots
- Order: Saxifragales
- Family: Penthoraceae
- Genus: Penthorum
- Species: P. chinense

Binomial name
- Penthorum chinense L.

Synonyms
- Penthorum humile Regel & Maack; Penthorum intermedium Turczaninow; Penthorum sedoides subsp. chinense (Pursh) S. Y. Li & K. T. Adair; Penthorum sedoides var. chinense (Pursh) Maximowicz

= Penthorum chinense =

Species of flowering plant

Penthorum chinense, commonly known as Oriental penthorum, is a plant species native to much of East Asia. It has been reported from China, Korea, Japan, Mongolia, Russia, Vietnam, Laos and Thailand. It is one of only two species in the genus, the other being Penthorum sedoides, native to the United States and Canada.

== Description ==
Penthorum chinense is a perennial herb up to 90 cm (35 inches) tall, spreading by underground rhizomes. Aerial stems are usually unbranched, with lanceolate leaves up to 10 cm (4 inches) long. Flowers are yellow, borne in a cyme at the top of the stem.

== Genomics ==
A telomere-to-telomere gap-free genome assembly of Penthorum chinense was published in 2023, representing the first telomere-to-telomere genome assembly reported for the order Saxifragales. The genome assembly spans approximately 257.5 Mb and consists of 9 chromosomes, with a BUSCO completeness of 99.7%. A total of 24,617 protein-coding genes were predicted.
