= Isojacareubin =

Names
- IUPAC name 6,10,11-Trihydroxy-3,3-dimethylpyrano[2,3-c]xanthen-7-one

Identifiers
CAS Number	50597-93-8
3D model (JSmol)	Interactive image
ChemSpider	8172044
PubChem CID	9996463
CompTox Dashboard (EPA)	DTXSID901045703
- InChI: InChI=1S/C18H14O6/c1-18(2)6-5-8-12(24-18)7-11(20)13-14(21)9-3-4-10(19)15(22)17(9)23-16(8)13/h3-7,19-20,22H,1-2H3 Key: FSTNFJKGRSHPBO-UHFFFAOYSA-N
- SMILES: CC1(C=CC2=C(O1)C=C(C3=C2OC4=C(C3=O)C=CC(=C4O)O)O)C

Properties
Chemical formula	C_{18}H_{14}O_{6}
Molar mass	326.304 g·mol^{−1}
- Except where otherwise noted, data are given for materials in their standard state (at 25 °C [77 °F], 100 kPa). Infobox references

Isojacareubin is a xanthonoid natural product found in Hypericum japonicum.

It has been shown to have antibacterial activity. Isojacareubin also inhibits protein kinase C isoforms, and has activity in an animal model of hepatocellular carcinoma.
