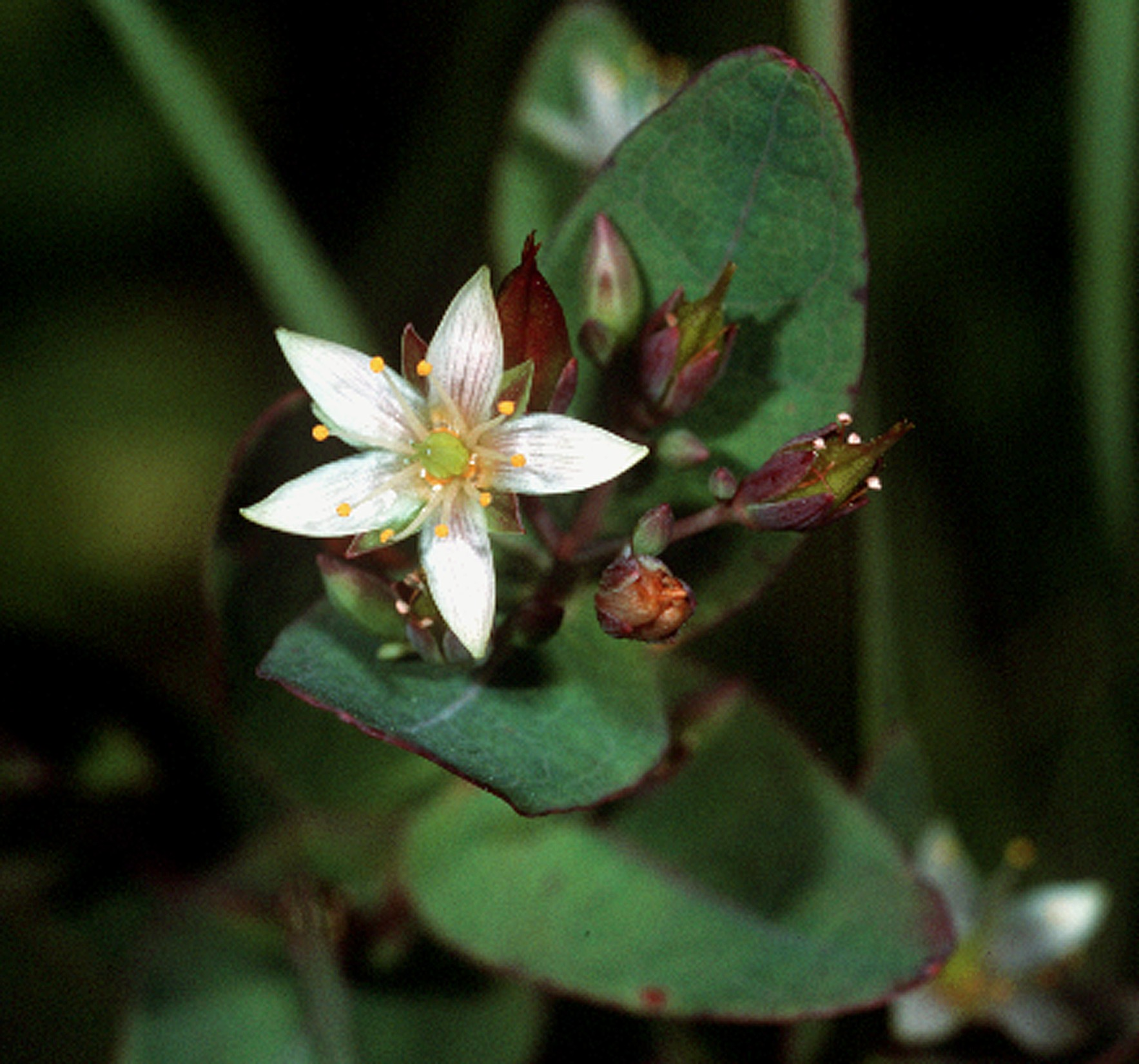
- Triadenum virginicum

Scientific classification
- Kingdom: Plantae
- Clade: Tracheophytes
- Clade: Angiosperms
- Clade: Eudicots
- Clade: Rosids
- Order: Malpighiales
- Family: Hypericaceae
- Tribe: Cratoxyleae
- Genus: Triadenum; Raf.

Type species
- T. fraseri (Spach) Gleason

Synonyms
- Gardenia Colden; Hypericum L. sect. Elodea Choisy

= Triadenum =

Genus of plants

Triadenum, known as marsh St. John's worts, is a small genus of flowering plants in the family Hypericaceae. The genus is characterized by opposite, blunt-tipped leaves and pink flowers with 9 stamens. They are distributed in North America and eastern Asia.

Acceptance of this genus is varied. Kew's Plants of the World Online and the Database of Vascular Plants of Canada (VASCAN) treat it as a junior synonym of Hypericum and the Flora of North America and Flora of China treat it as separate. The situation arises from B. R. Ruhfel et al. (2011)'s genetic study describing Triadenum as subsumed under Hypericum and later genetic results disagreeing with this assessment. Under Hypericum, the species are mostly treated as the section Hypericum sect. Elodea.

== Species ==
Triadenum contains the following 6 species according to Flora of North America and Flora of China:

- Triadenum breviflorum (Wall.)
- Triadenum fraseri (Spach) Gleason
- Triadenum japonicum (Thunb.)
- Triadenum tubulosum (Walter) Gleason
- Triadenum virginicum (L.) Raf.
- Triadenum walteri (J.F.Gmel.) Gleason
