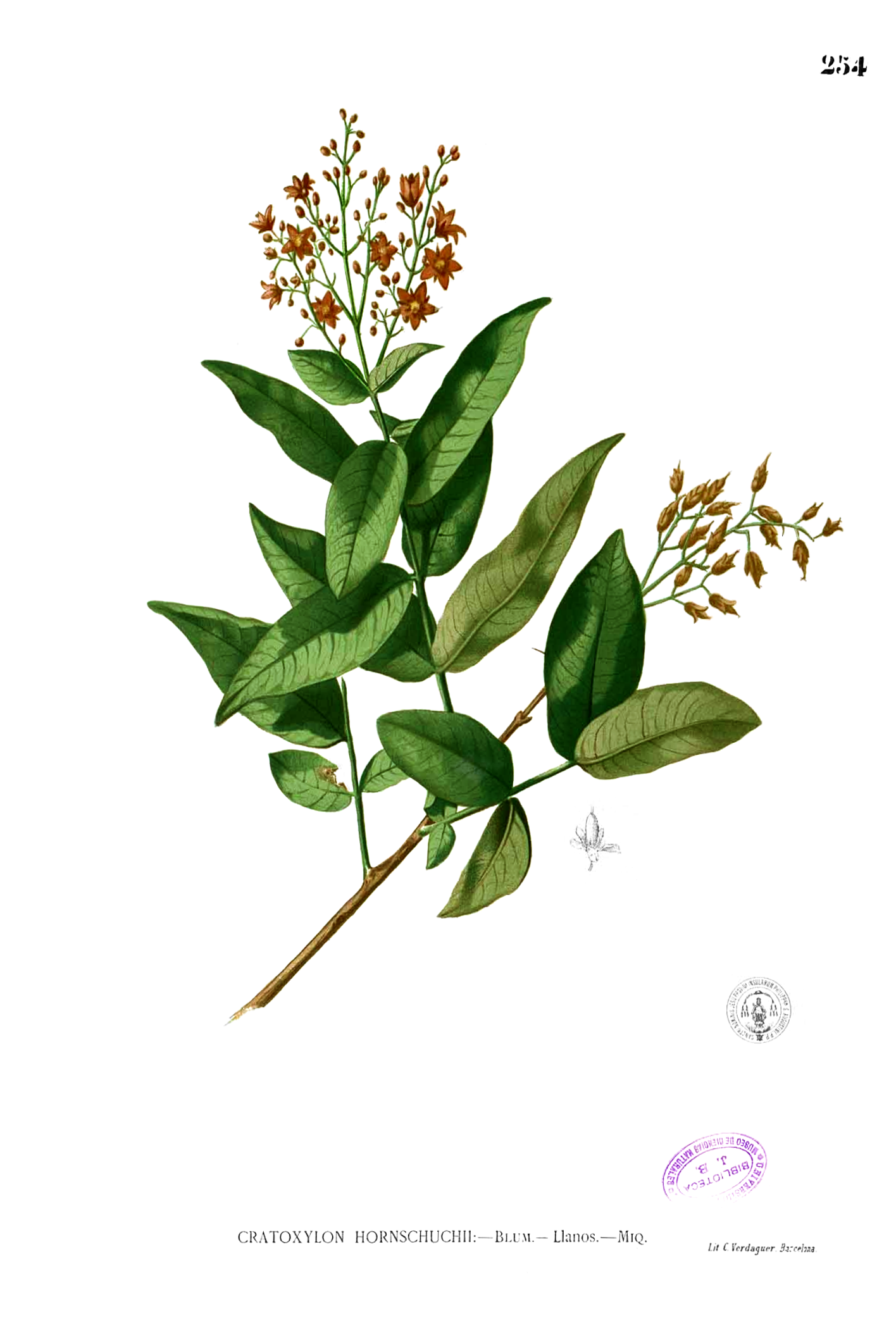
- Cratoxylum hornschuchii Blume 1823

Scientific classification
- Kingdom: Plantae
- Clade: Tracheophytes
- Clade: Angiosperms
- Clade: Eudicots
- Clade: Rosids
- Order: Malpighiales
- Family: Hypericaceae
- Tribe: Cratoxyleae; Engl.

Genera
- Cratoxylum Blume; Eliea Cambess.; Triadenum Cambess.

= Cratoxyleae =

Tribe of flowering plants

Cratoxyleae is a tribe of plants in the Hypericaceae family known as yellow cattle woods. It contains the genera Cratoxylum, Eliea, and Triadenum.
