= Hypericum tertiaerum =

Scientific classification
- Kingdom: Plantae
- Clade: Tracheophytes
- Clade: Angiosperms
- Clade: Eudicots
- Clade: Rosids
- Order: Malpighiales
- Family: Hypericaceae
- Genus: Hypericum
- Species: †H. tertiaerum

Binomial name
- †Hypericum tertiaerum Nikitin

Extinct species of flowering plant

Hypericum tertiaerum is an extinct species of the genus Hypericum. Seeds of H. tertiaerum have been found in Central and Eastern Europe and Siberia, and date from the Lower to Upper Miocene and the Pliocene. While it has sufficient identifying characteristics to place it within Hypericum, there is not enough surviving detail to assign it to any subdivisions within the genus. However, it has been determined that the seeds of H. japonicum, H. virginicum, and H. tubulosum closely resemble those of H. tertiaerum.
