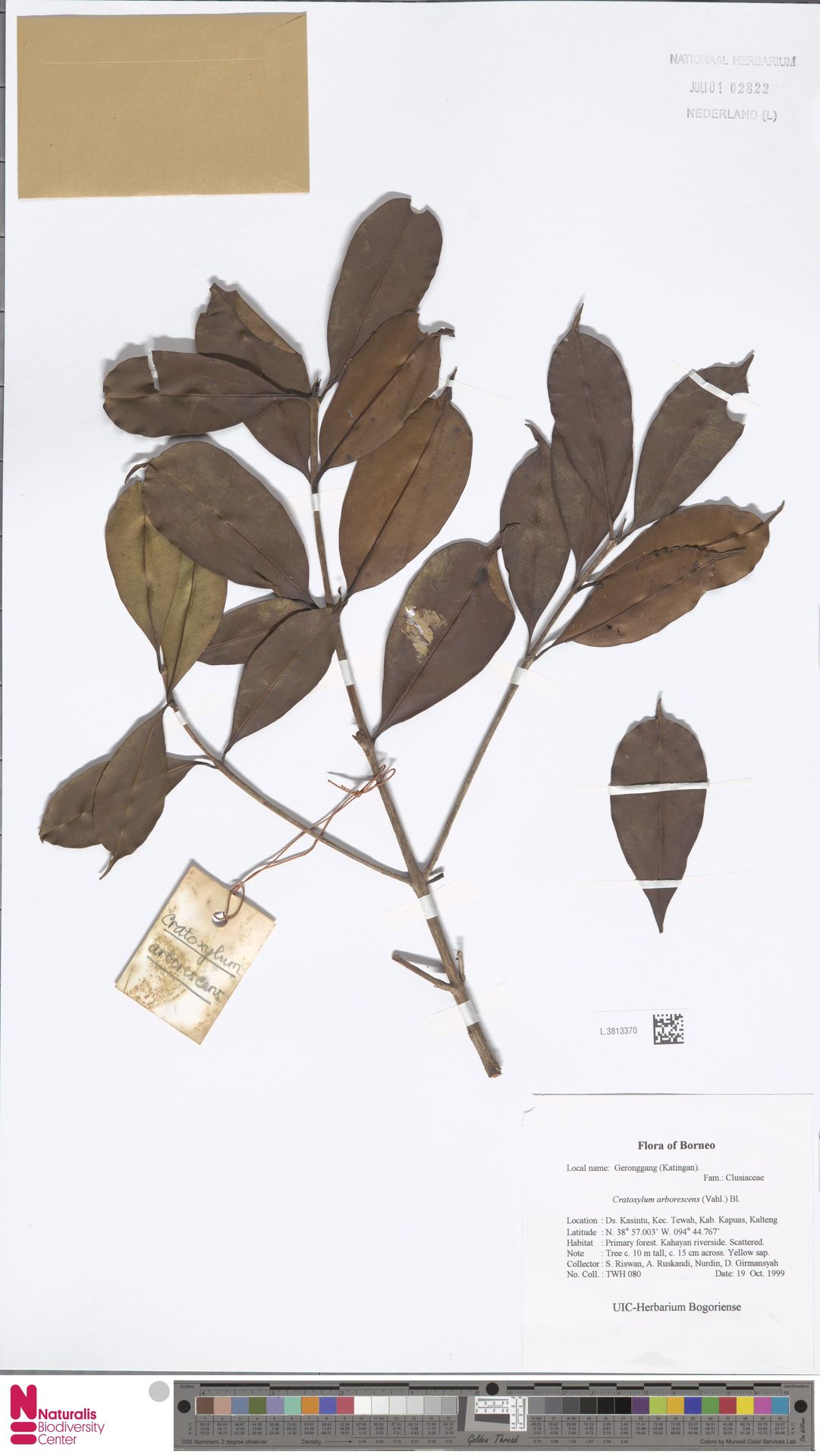

Conservation status
- Least Concern (IUCN 2.3)

Scientific classification
- Kingdom: Plantae
- Clade: Tracheophytes
- Clade: Angiosperms
- Clade: Eudicots
- Clade: Rosids
- Order: Malpighiales
- Family: Hypericaceae
- Genus: Cratoxylum
- Species: C. arborescens

Binomial name
- Cratoxylum arborescens (Vahl) Blume

Synonyms
- Cratoxylum arborescens var. miquelii King; Cratoxylum cuneatum Miq.

= Cratoxylum arborescens =

Species of flowering plant

Cratoxylum arborescens is a plant in the family Hypericaceae. The specific epithet arborescens is from the Latin meaning "tree-like".

== Description ==
Cratoxylum arborescens grows as a shrub or tree measuring up to 60 metres (200 ft) tall with a diameter of up to 120 centimetres (50 in). The smooth to fissured bark is grey to brown. The flowers are pink to crimson. The fruits measure up to 0.9 cm (0.4 in) long.

== Distribution and habitat ==
Cratoxylum arborescens grows naturally in Burma, Sumatra, Peninsular Malaysia and Borneo. Its habitat is mainly lowland forests, including kerangas and peat swamp forests, also up to lower montane forests, from sea-level to 1,400 metres (4,600 ft) altitude.

== Uses ==
This tree produces a light hardwood timber known as Geronggang. This timber is suitable for interior work and light to medium construction.
