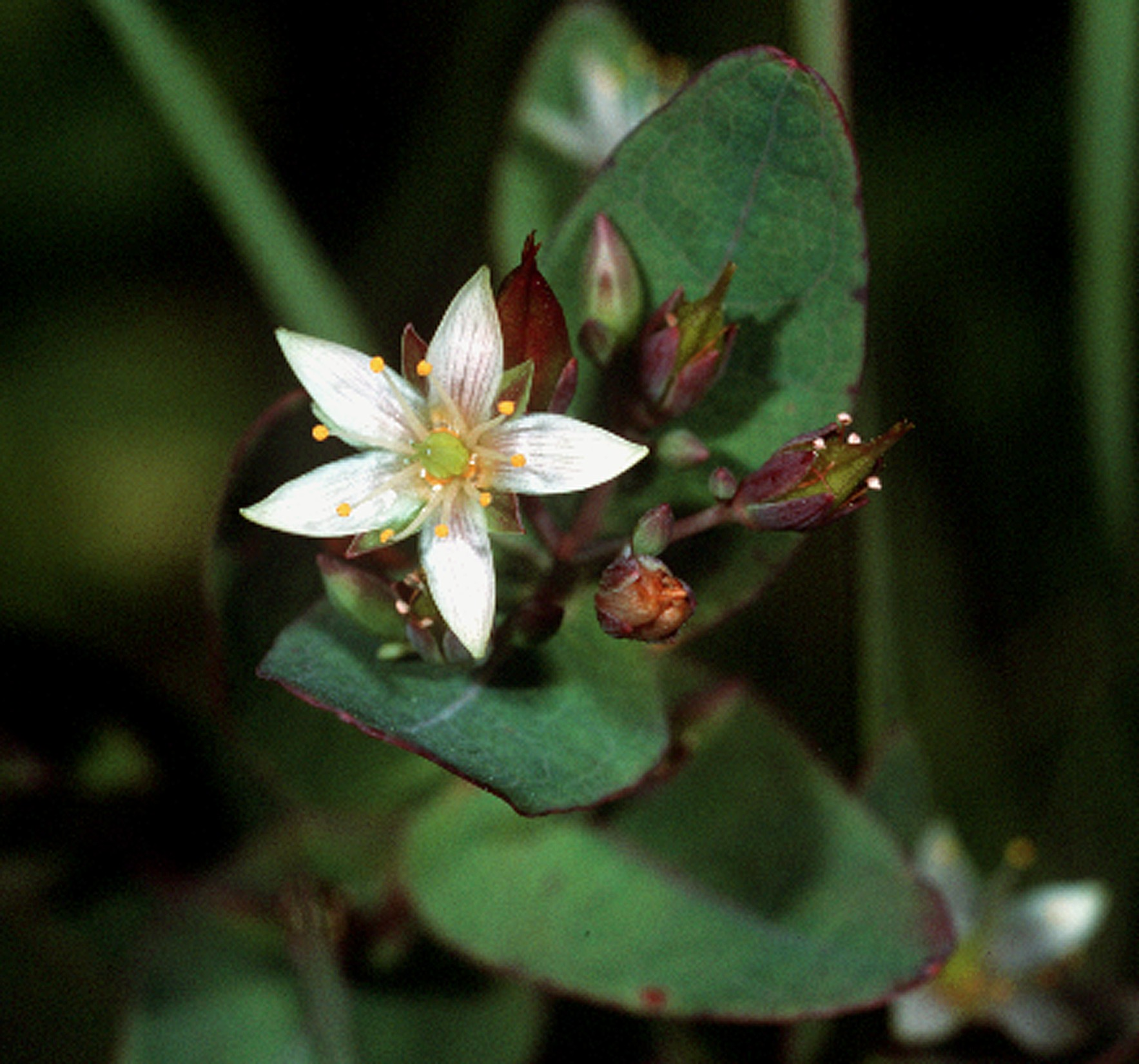

Scientific classification
- Kingdom: Plantae
- Clade: Tracheophytes
- Clade: Angiosperms
- Clade: Eudicots
- Clade: Rosids
- Order: Malpighiales
- Family: Hypericaceae
- Genus: Hypericum
- Section: Hypericum sect. Elodea
- Species: H. virginicum

Binomial name
- Hypericum virginicum L.

Synonyms
- List: Androsaemum emarginatum (Lam.) K.Koch; Elodes campanulata Pursh; Elodes canadensis Fraser ex Spach; Elodes drumondii Spach; Elodes emarginata Steud.; Elodes pauciflora Spach; Elodes virginica (L.) Nutt.; Hypericum campanulatum Walter; Hypericum emarginatum Lam.; Hypericum enneandrum Stokes; Martia campanulata Spreng.; Martia virginicum (L.) Spreng.; Triadenum purpurascens Raf.; Triadenum purpureum Raf.; Triadenum virginicum (L.) Raf.

= Hypericum virginicum =

Species of flowering plant in the St John's wort family

Hypericum virginicum, the marsh St. Johns-wort or Virginia marsh St. Johnswort, is a species of flowering plant in the family Hypericaceae. It is native to the central and eastern United States and eastern Canada.

== Description ==
Hypericum virginicum is a small herbaceous plant growing up to 70 cm (28 in) in height. Its leaves are sessile and opposite, sometimes clasping. The flowers grow up to 15 mm (0.6 in) in diameter, with 5 pink or white petals. It flowers in the summer to early fall and grows in bogs, wet meadows, fens, swamps, and along lakeshores.

It can be distinguished from the closely related Hypericum fraseri by its longer, acute sepals, and longer styles. The seeds of H. virginicum closely resemble those of the extinct paleospecies Hypericum tertiaerum.

== Taxonomy ==
Alexander Garden first observed this plant in 1754, but following correspondence with Jane Colden realized that she had previously collected and recorded the same species in 1753, one year before his discovery. As such, Jane Colden held naming rights for what both naturalists thought would be a newly described genus. Colden generously offered to name it Gardenia in Garden's honor, however this was later rejected by Carl Linnaeus when John Ellis also proposed naming the cape jasmine Gardenia jasminoides in Garden's honor. As cape jasmine had been collected earlier (at least by 1680) it received priority in naming.

In the end it was originally described as Hypericum virginicum by Linnaeus in 1759. In 1837 Rafinesque proposed placing it a new genus, Triadenum, acknowledging, perhaps unknowingly, Jane Colden's original belief that Hypericum virginicum was sufficiently unique to warrant its own genus. Members of the genus Triadenum have white to pink petals, always 9 stamens, and three staminodal glands alternating between the stamen fascicles.

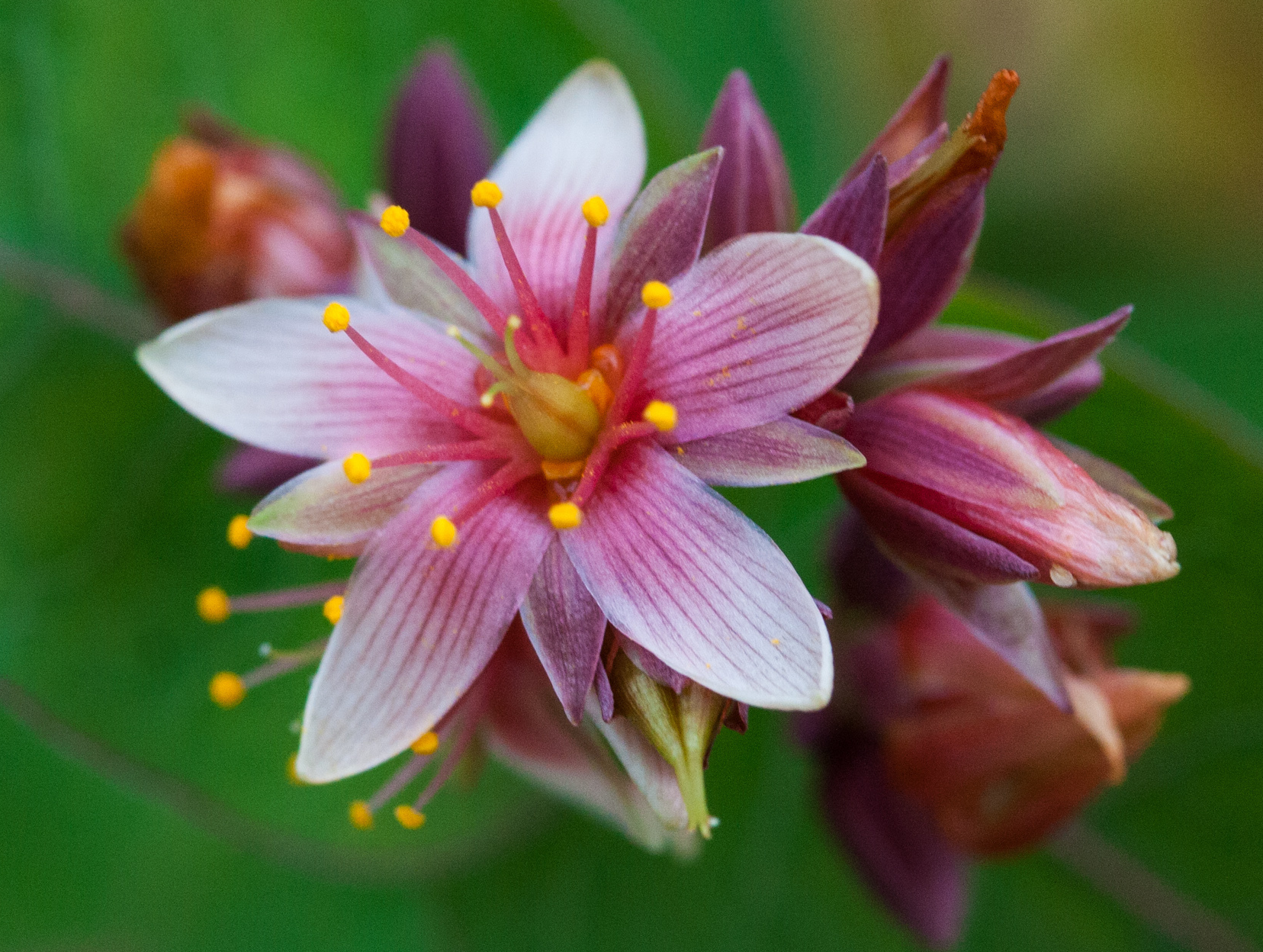
Close-up of the flower

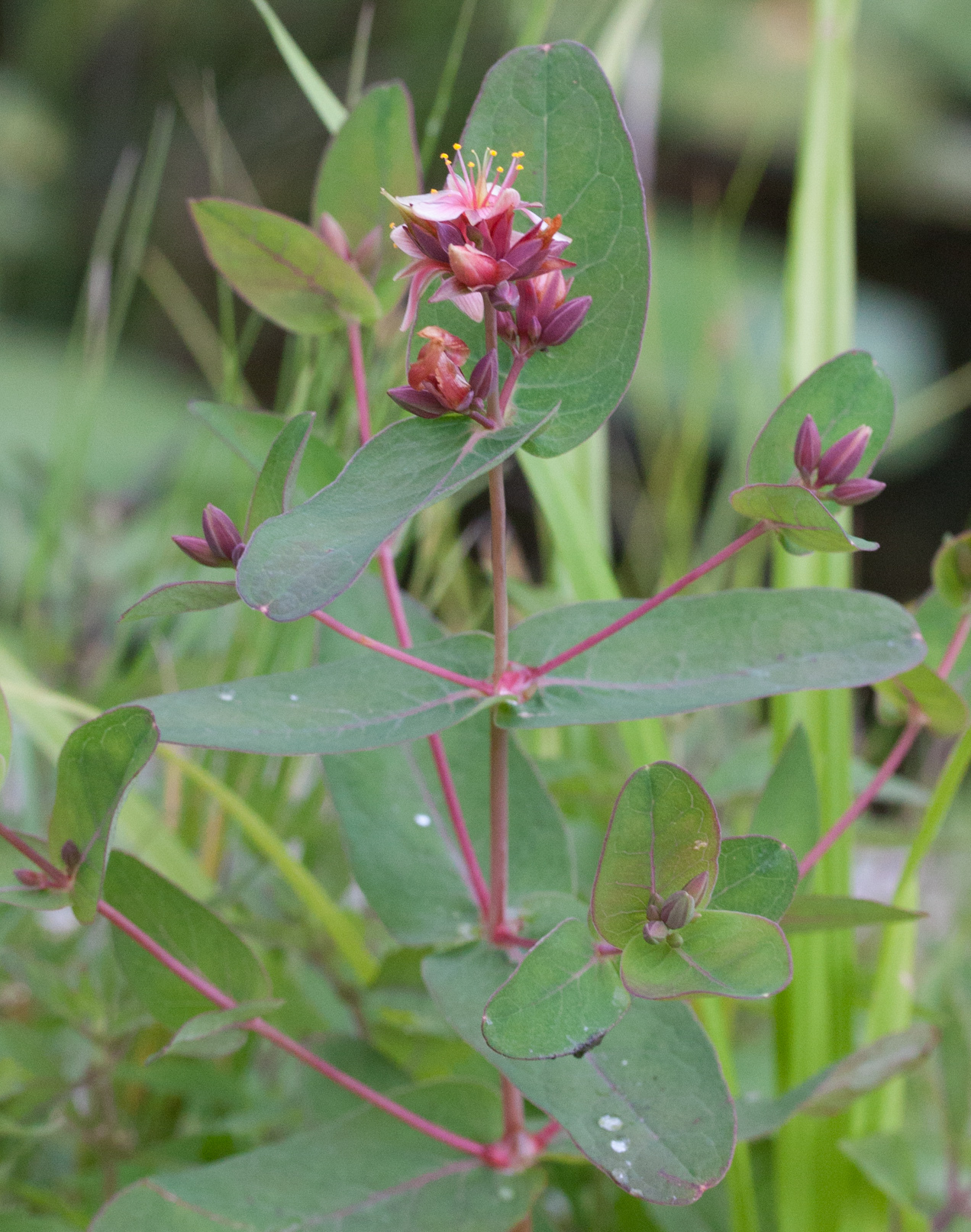
In Carroll County, New Hampshire
