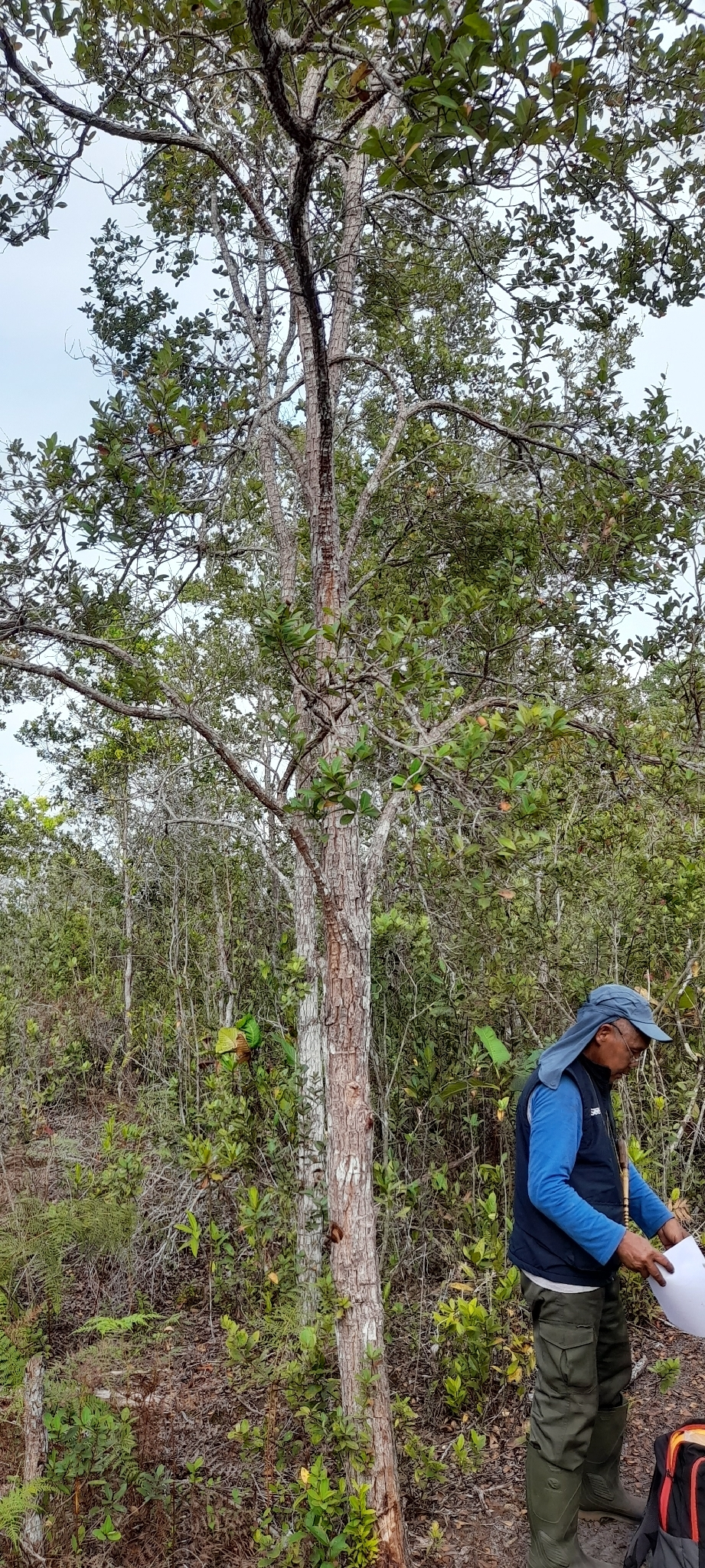
- In West Kalimantan, Borneo

Conservation status
- Least Concern (IUCN 3.1)

Scientific classification
- Kingdom: Plantae
- Clade: Tracheophytes
- Clade: Angiosperms
- Clade: Eudicots
- Clade: Rosids
- Order: Malpighiales
- Family: Hypericaceae
- Genus: Cratoxylum
- Species: C. glaucum

Binomial name
- Cratoxylum glaucum Korth.

Synonyms
- Cratoxylum microphyllum Miq.; Cratoxylum polystachyum Turcz.; Cratoxylum procerum Diels

= Cratoxylum glaucum =

Species of flowering plant

Cratoxylum glaucum is a species of flowering plant in the family Hypericaceae. It is a tree native to Borneo, Peninsular Malaysia, and Sumatra.

The species was described by Pieter Willem Korthals in 1848. The specific epithet glaucum is from the Latin meaning 'blue-green', referring to the colour of the leaf underside.

== Description ==
Cratoxylum glaucum grows as a shrub or tree measuring up to 25 metres (80 ft) tall with a diameter of up to 45 centimetres (20 in). The flaky bark is reddish brown. The flowers are crimson. The fruits measure up to 1 cm (0.4 in) long.

== Distribution and habitat ==
Cratoxylum glaucum grows naturally in Sumatra, Peninsular Malaysia and Borneo (including offshore islands). Its habitat is primary and secondary lowland rain forests (including kerangas forests and peat swamp forests) from sea-level to 1,100 metres (3,600 ft) elevation.
