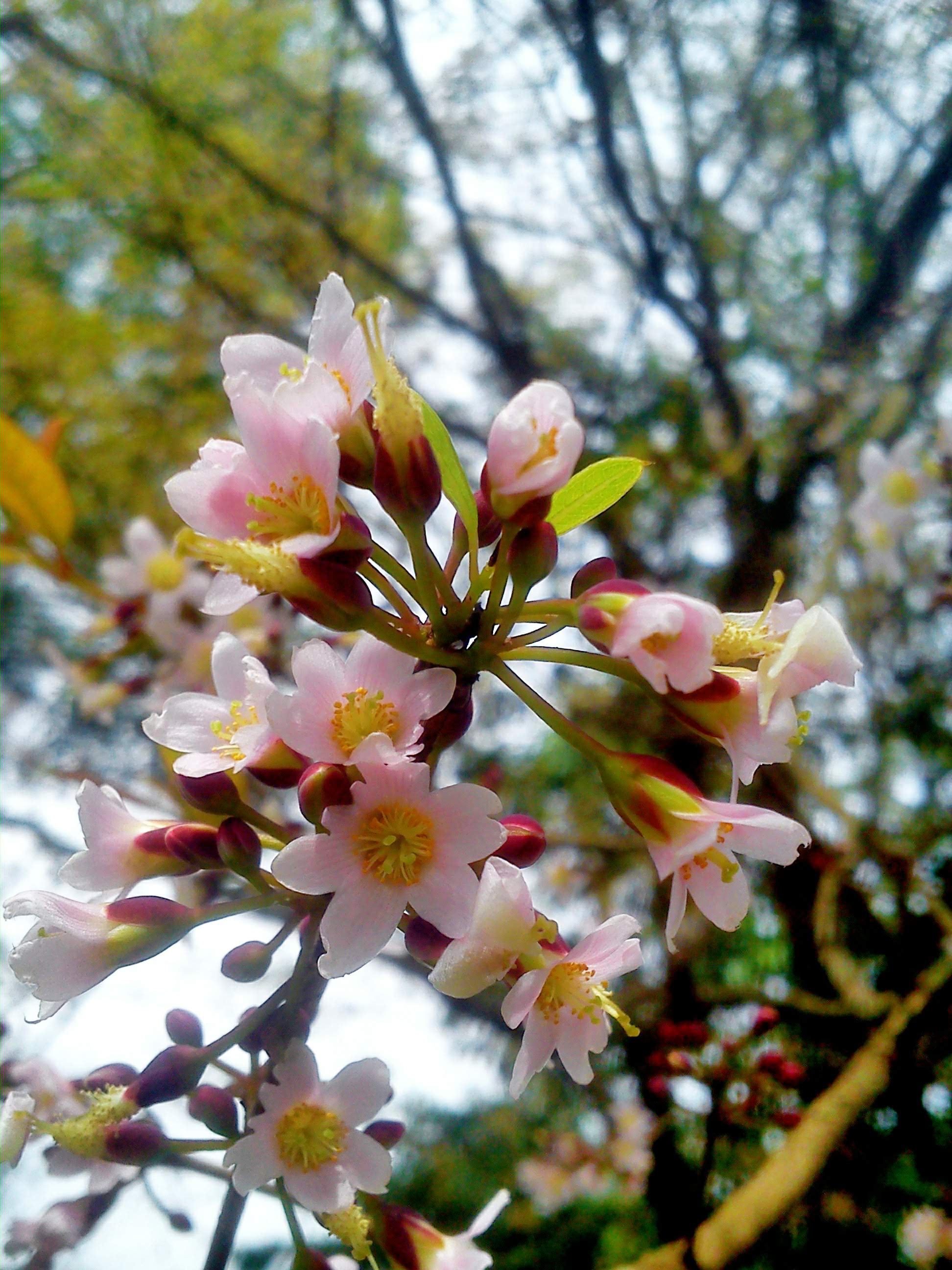

Conservation status
- Least Concern (IUCN 3.1)

Scientific classification
- Kingdom: Plantae
- Clade: Tracheophytes
- Clade: Angiosperms
- Clade: Eudicots
- Clade: Rosids
- Order: Malpighiales
- Family: Hypericaceae
- Genus: Cratoxylum
- Species: C. formosum

Binomial name
- Cratoxylum formosum (Jack) Benth. & Hook.f. ex Dyer

Synonyms
- Elodes formosa Jack; Tridesmis jackii Spach; Ancistrolobus formosus (Jack) Zoll. & Moritzi

= Cratoxylum formosum =

Species of tree

Cratoxylum formosum is a species of flowering plant in the family Hypericaceae. Its commercial name in timber production is "mampat". The trees reach to 35 metres (115 ft) tall, though they rarely achieve the size required for timber exploitation.

== Description ==
The leaves are 5–9 centimetres (2.0–3.5 in) long, and are arranged on the stem such that they overlap one another. They are elliptic, glabrous (lacking hairs), and have a papery texture. The flower clusters (inflorescences) are cymes that are shaped somewhat like short racemes. The flowers are white or pink, with sepals a quarter of the length of the petals, which have a rounded base.

== Taxonomy ==
The species was previously placed in the defunct genus Elodes under the name Elodes formosa. The Catalogue of Life lists two subspecies, C. formosum subsp. formosum and C. formosum subsp. pruniflorum (Kurz) Gogelein. The two are differentiated by the nominate subspecies being totally glabrous, with leaves that are elliptic to oblong, rarely lanceolate and the anther connective not being glandular.

== Distribution and habitat ==
Cratoxylum formosum is a tropical plant found in the Andaman Islands, Brunei, Burma, Cambodia, China, Indonesia, Laos, Malaysia, the Philippines, Singapore, Thailand, and Vietnam. The trees bloom during the dry period in seasonal tropical climates. They inhabit primary and secondary forests at altitudes from 0–600 m, with the upper limit to 1200 m, on slopes, river margins and swamps in sandy to clayey soils.

== Conservation ==
Cratoxylum formosum is listed as least concern by the International Union for the Conservation of Nature, but it is considered to be rare in Singapore. It has a widespread distribution and does not face any major threats, though it is used in Laos for the production of charcoal.

== Gallery ==
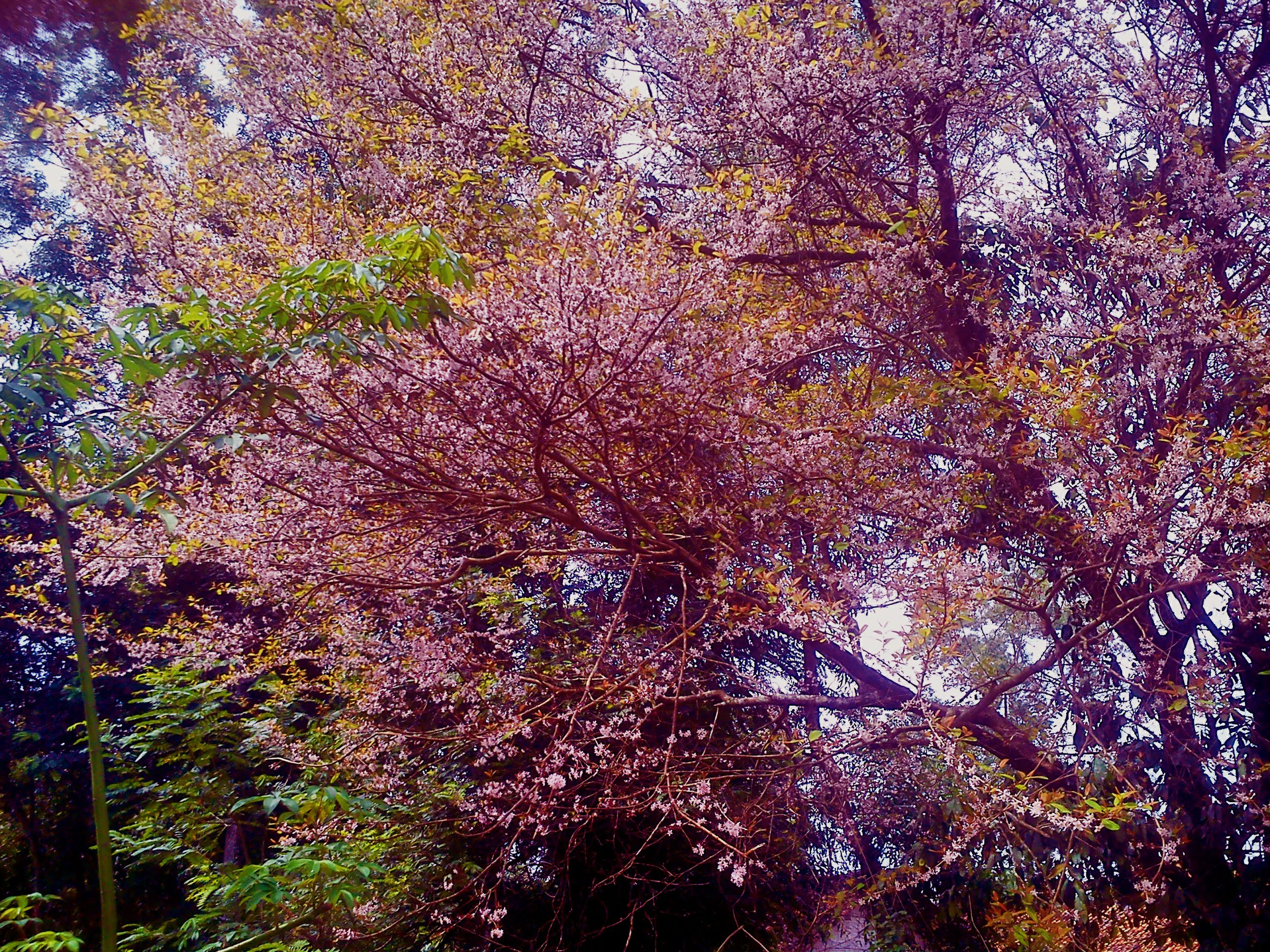
Cratoxylum formosum in bloom

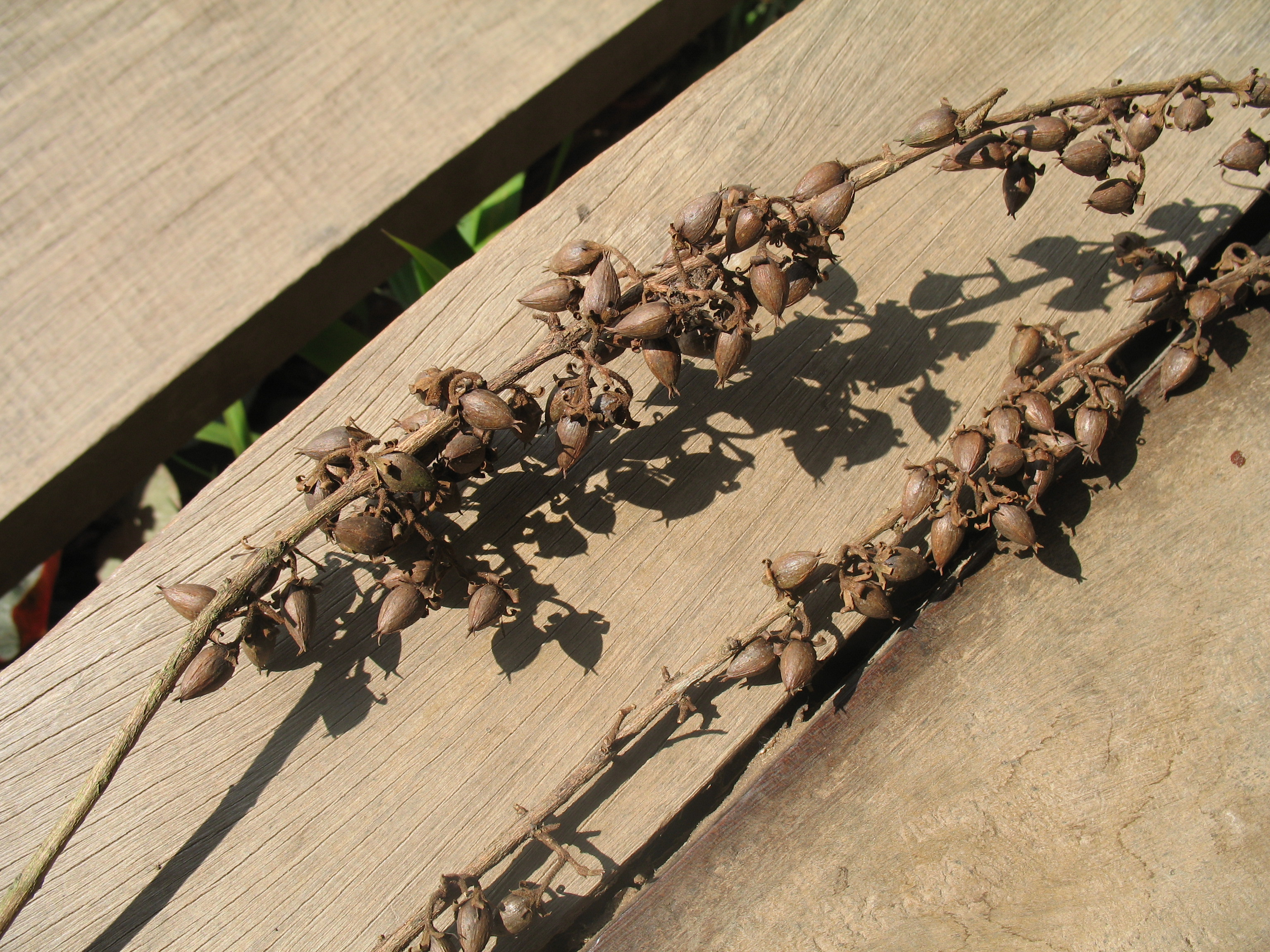
Fruit

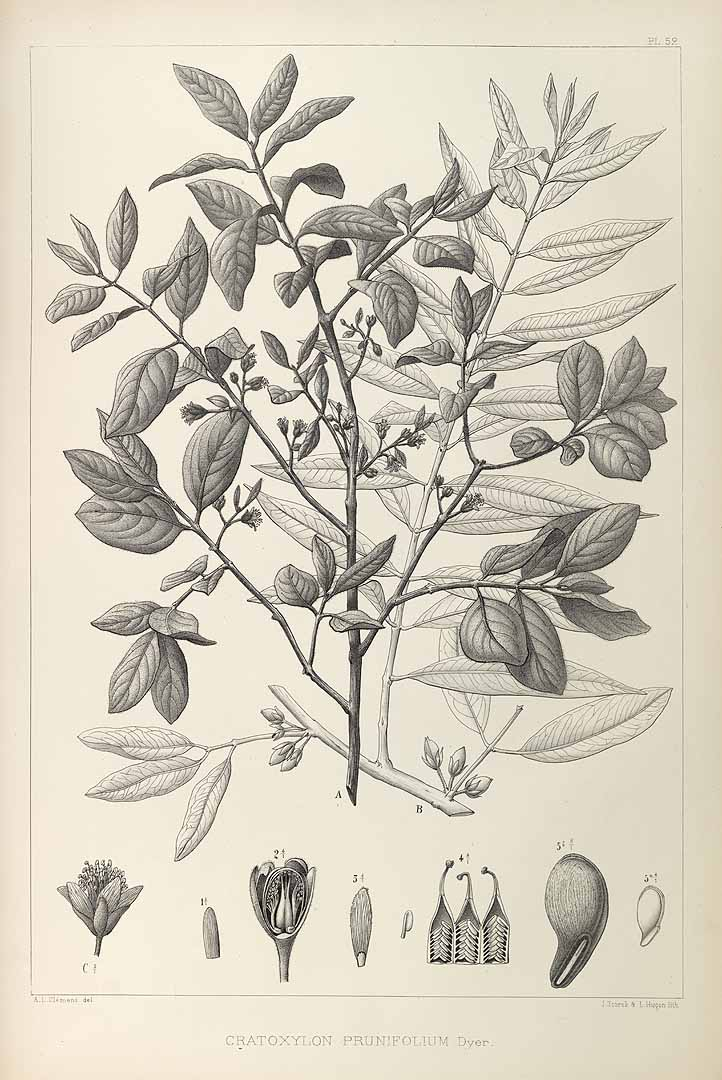
Drawing of the species (1880 to 1883)
