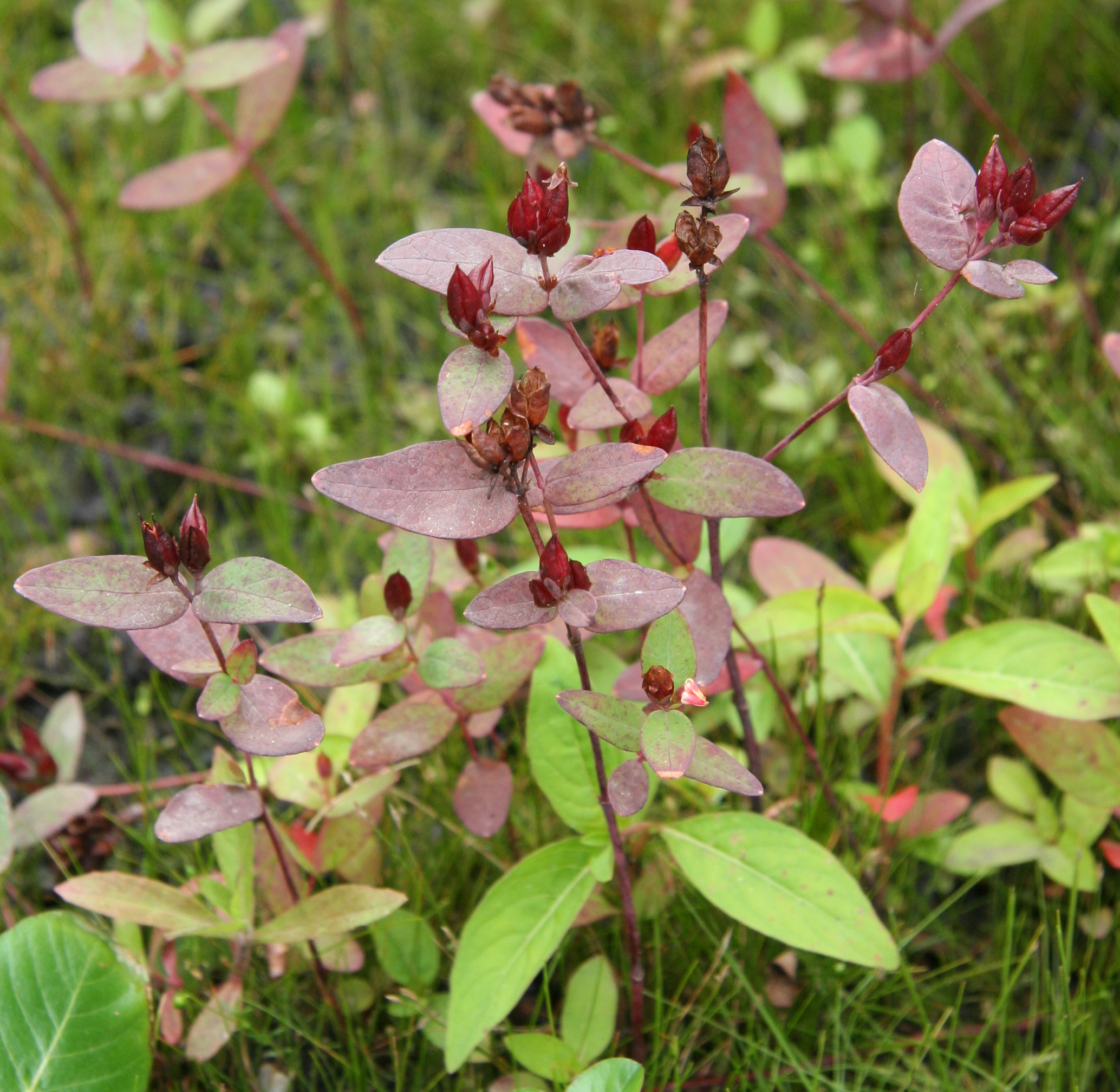

Conservation status
- Secure (NatureServe)

Scientific classification
- Kingdom: Plantae
- Clade: Embryophytes
- Clade: Tracheophytes
- Clade: Angiosperms
- Clade: Eudicots
- Clade: Rosids
- Order: Malpighiales
- Family: Hypericaceae
- Genus: Triadenum
- Species: T. fraseri

Binomial name
- Triadenum fraseri (Spach) Gleason

Synonyms
- Hypericum fraseri

= Hypericum fraseri =

Species of flowering plant in the St John's wort family

Triadenum fraseri, commonly known as bog St. John's wort, Fraser's St. John's wort, and Fraser's marsh St. John's wort, is a perennial flowering plant in the family Hypericaceae that grows in wetlands of Canada and the northern United States. It is named after John Fraser (1750–1811), a Scottish botanist and widely travelled plant collector.

== Description ==
Triadenum fraseri is a perennial forb that can grow to heights of 1 ft (0.30 m) to 2 ft (0.61 m). The plant has blue-green, sometimes purple-tinged, stalkless, elliptical, opposite leaves that are typically 2.5 in (6.4 cm) long and to 1.75 in (4.4 cm) wide, with prominent, often red stems and veins.

The plant displays clusters of a few to several flowers arising from leaf axils, at the end of branching stems. The pink five-petal flowers with green or purplish sepals that range from 0.25 in (0.64 cm) to 0.75 in (1.9 cm) wide when fully open (but they are rarely open). The flower typically appears closed like a bud. Each flower features 9 to 12 yellow stamens. The plant's fruit is a three-sectioned dark-red or orange pointed capsule, 0.25 in (0.64 cm) to 0.5 in (1.3 cm) long. Triadenum fraseri is typically in flower each year from July through September.

== Taxonomy ==
The genus name Triadenum is derived from the Greek meaning "three glands". This name refers to the plant's three-chambered capsule fruit. The species was named in honor of 18th- and early 19th-century Scottish botanist John Fraser (1750–1811). During his career, Fraser served Russian monarchs and collected plant specimens during voyages through North America, the West Indies, and Russia. Fraser was hailed early on by his biographers as "one of the most enterprising, indefatigable, and persevering men that ever embarked in the cause of botany and natural science".

Triadenum fraseri is closely related to Triadenum virginicum.

Botanists have applied several synonyms in identifying Triadenum fraseri, including:

- Elodea fraseri Spach
- Hypericum fraseri (Spach) Steud.
- Hypericum virginicum var. fraseri (Spach) Fernald
- Triadenum virginicum ssp. fraseri (Spach) J. Gillett
- Triadenum virginicum var. fraseri (Spach) Cooperr.

== Distribution and habitat ==
Triadenum fraseri thrives in wetlands habitats of "bogs, marshes, swales, sedgy meadows, moist sandy (even marly) shores, conifer swamps and alder thickets".

The United States Department of Agriculture describes Triadenum fraseri as a native species within the states of Connecticut, Illinois, Indiana, Iowa, Maine, Massachusetts, Michigan, Minnesota, Nebraska (rare), New Hampshire, New Jersey (rare), New York, North Carolina (rare), Ohio, Pennsylvania, Rhode Island, Tennessee (rare), Vermont, Virginia (rare), Washington, West Virginia, and Wisconsin, in the United States; and in the provinces of British Columbia, Manitoba, New Brunswick, Nova Scotia, Ontario, Quebec, Newfoundland, Prince Edward Island, Saskatchewan (rare), in Canada; and in the French overseas territories of Saint Pierre and Miquelon. It is categorized as an "obligate wetland" plant by the U.S. Army Corps of Engineers for the Atlantic and Gulf Coastal Plain, Eastern Mountains and Piedmont, Great Plains, Midwest, Northcentral and Northeast; and Western Mountains, Valleys, and Coast regions.
