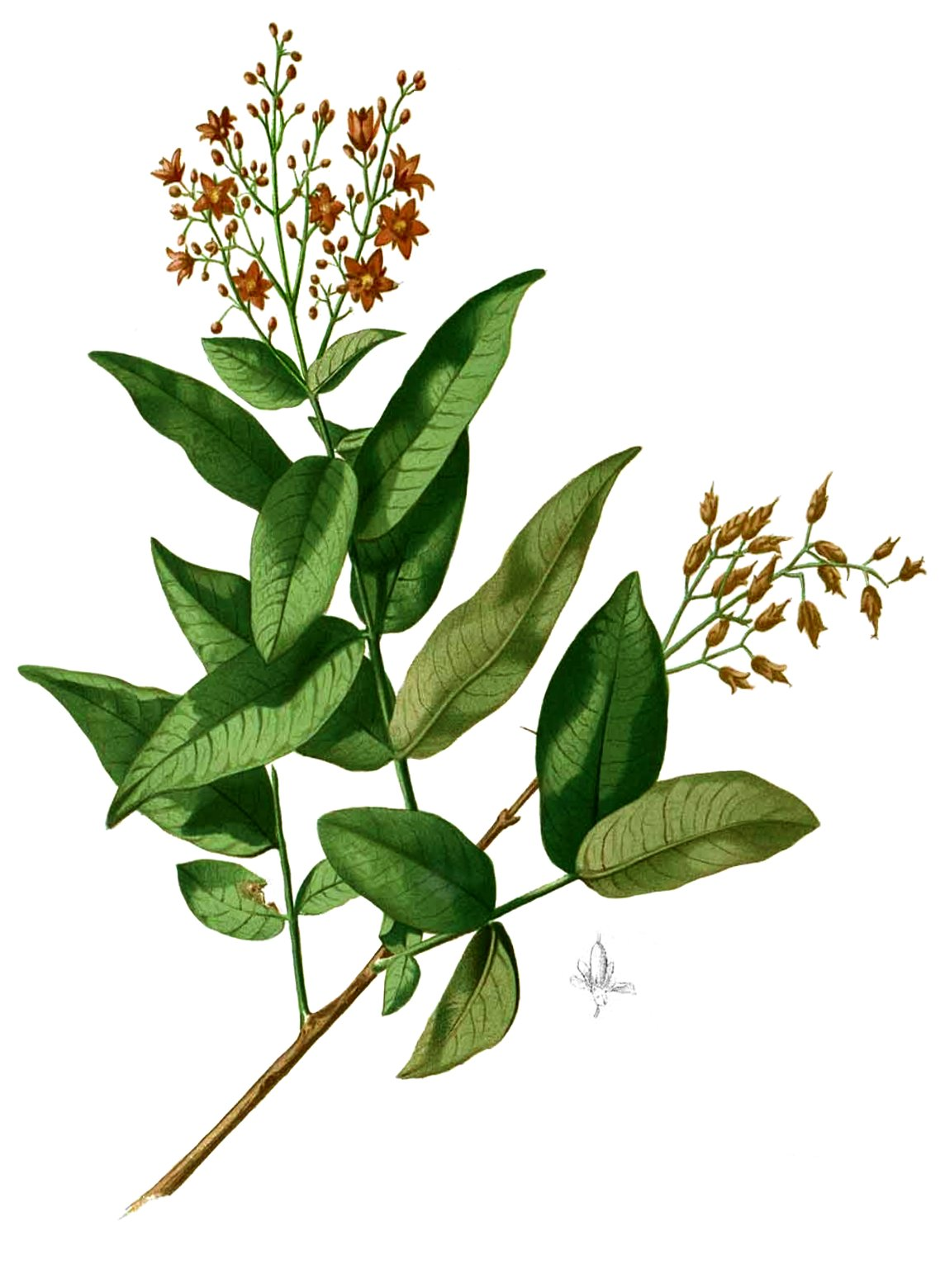
- Cratoxylum sumatranum

Scientific classification
- Kingdom: Plantae
- Clade: Tracheophytes
- Clade: Angiosperms
- Clade: Eudicots
- Clade: Rosids
- Order: Malpighiales
- Family: Hypericaceae
- Tribe: Cratoxyleae
- Genus: Cratoxylum; Blume

Species
- See text

Synonyms
- Ancistrolobus Spach; Elodea J.St.-Hil.; Tridesmis Spach

= Cratoxylum =

Genus of flowering plants

Cratoxylum (or Cratoxylon Blume, an orthographic variant) is a genus of flowering plants in the family Hypericaceae, native to tropical Asia. The generic name means "strong wood", referring to the timber.

== Description ==
Cratoxylum species grow as shrubs or small to medium-sized trees. The bark, drying black, produces a yellow resinous sap. The flowers are white or pink to crimson. The ellipsoid fruits consist of three valves.

== Distribution and habitat ==
Cratoxylum species grow naturally from India through southern China to Malesia.

== Species ==
As of December 2023, Plants of the World Online recognises seven species:

- Cratoxylum arborescens (Vahl) Blume
- Cratoxylum cochinchinense (Lour.) Blume
- Cratoxylum formosum (Jack) Benth. & Hook.f. ex Dyer
- Cratoxylum glaucum Korth.
- Cratoxylum maingayi Dyer
- Cratoxylum neriifolium Kurz
- Cratoxylum sumatranum (Jack) Blume
