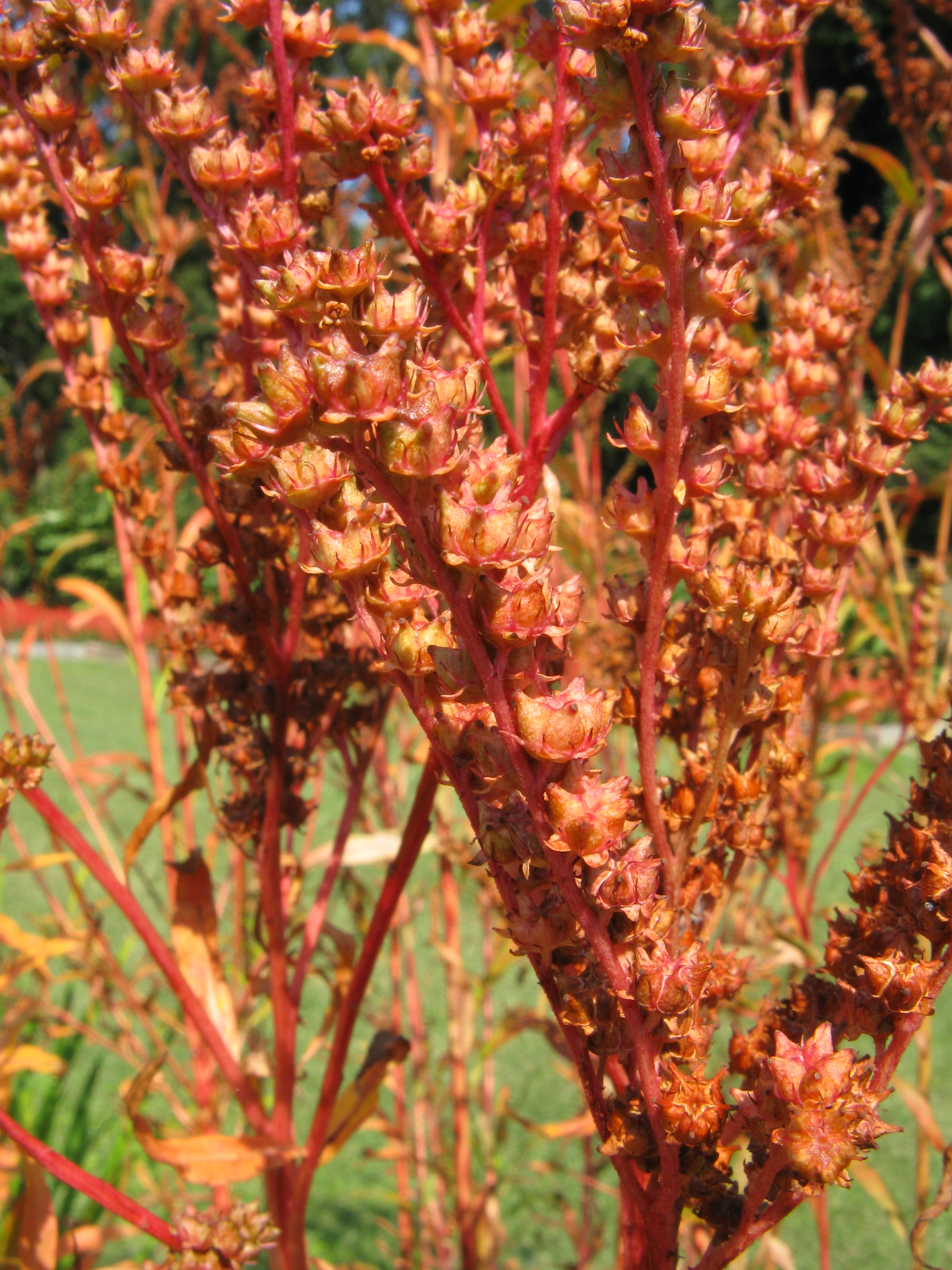
- Penthorum chinense

Scientific classification
- Kingdom: Plantae
- Clade: Tracheophytes
- Clade: Angiosperms
- Clade: Eudicots
- Order: Saxifragales
- Family: Penthoraceae; Rydb. ex Britt.
- Genus: Penthorum; L.

Type species
- P. sedoides L.

Species
- Penthorum chinense Penthorum sedoides
- The range of Penthorum.

= Penthorum =

Genus of flowering plants

Penthorum is a genus of plants in the order Saxifragales. They are erect herbaceous perennials about half a meter tall. The genus consists of two species, one from east Asia and one from eastern North America. It is variously classified in the family Saxifragaceae or its own family Penthoraceae. Its closest relatives may be in Haloragaceae.
