= Eliea =

Conservation status
- Least Concern (IUCN 3.1)

Scientific classification
- Kingdom: Plantae
- Clade: Tracheophytes
- Clade: Angiosperms
- Clade: Eudicots
- Clade: Rosids
- Order: Malpighiales
- Family: Hypericaceae
- Tribe: Cratoxyleae
- Genus: Eliea; Cambess.
- Species: E. articulata

Binomial name
- Eliea articulata (Lam.) Cambess.

Synonyms
- Genus: Eliaea (orthographic variant); Species: Hypericum articulatum Lam.

Genus of flowering plants

Eliea is a genus of flowering plants, shrubs or small trees, in the St. Johnswort family, Hypericaceae. It comprises a single species, Eliea articulata, which is endemic to Madagascar.

== Description ==
It is a small shrub growing up to 10 ft (3.0 m) in height with jointed branches and opposite leaves. The flowers have five petals, numerous stamens, and three styles.

== Taxonomy ==
The genus was named in honor of M. Elie de Beaumont. Eliea articulata was originally described as Hypericum articulatum Lam. in 1797. It was renamed Eliea articulata in 1830, published in the Annales des Sciences Naturelles.

Eliea brevistyla and Eliea majorifolia are considered synonyms in Kew's Plants of the World Online and the Tropicos Catalogue of the Plants of Madagascar.
