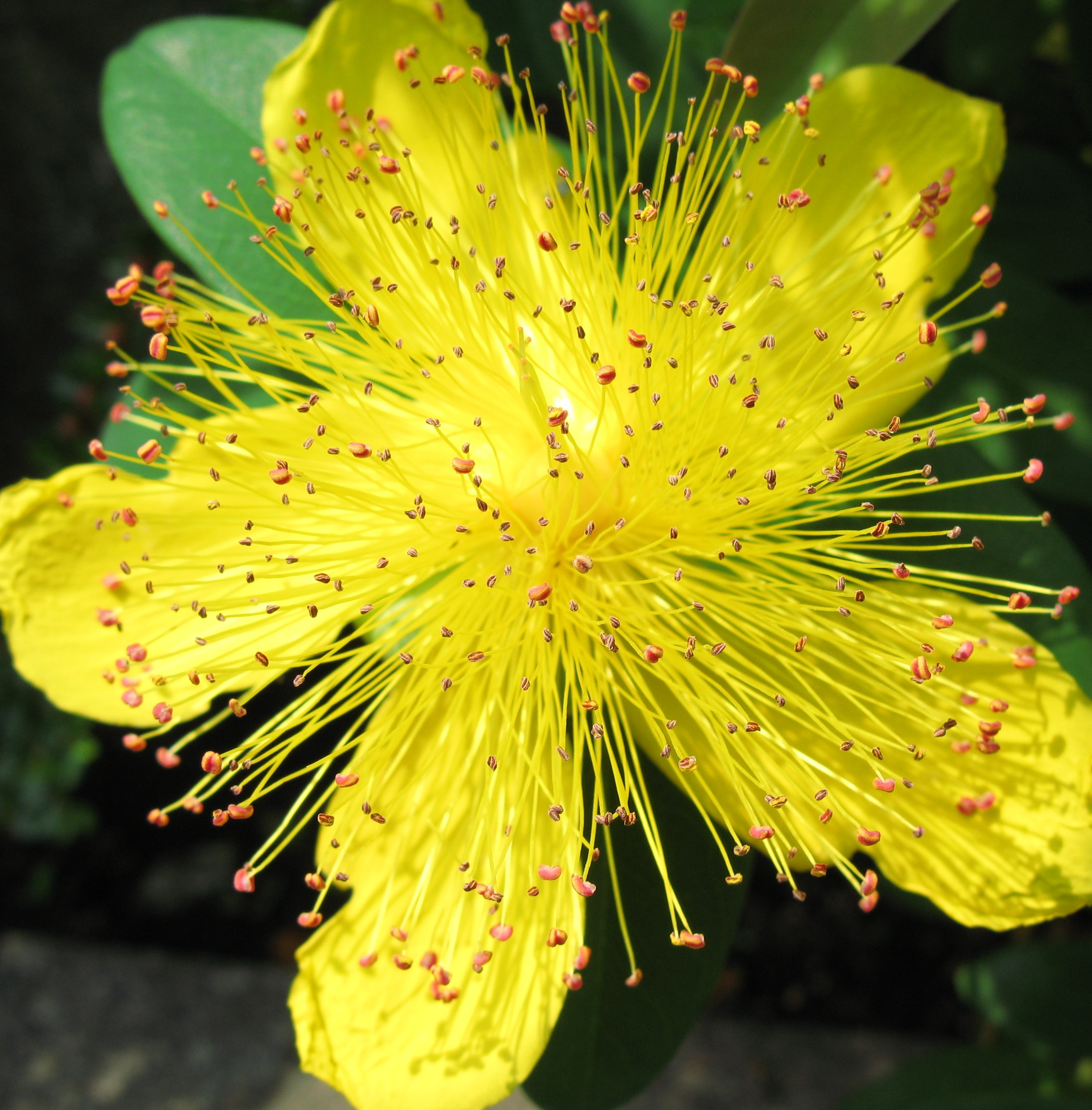

Scientific classification
- Kingdom: Plantae
- Clade: Tracheophytes
- Clade: Angiosperms
- Clade: Eudicots
- Clade: Rosids
- Order: Malpighiales
- Family: Hypericaceae
- Genus: Hypericum
- Section: H. sect. Trigynobrathys
- Species: H. japonicum

Binomial name
- Hypericum japonicum Thunb. 1784

Synonyms
- Brathys japonica (Thunb. ex Murray) Wight; H. chinense Osbeck; H. jeongjocksanense S.J.Park & K.J.Kim; H. mutilum sensu Maxim.; Sarothra japonica (Thunb.) Y. Kimura

= Hypericum japonicum =

Species of flowering plant in the St John's wort family

Hypericum japonicum, known as matted St. John's-wort, is an annual herbaceous flowering plant in the St. John's wort family Hypericaceae, in Hypericum sect. Trigynobrathys.

== Description ==
H. japonicum is unusually small for a St. John's wort, growing only 2–5 cm (0.8–2.0 in) tall. Its stems are green and 4-angled, with 2–52 mm (0.1–2.0 in) long internodes that usually exceed the leaves. The leaves are sessile and spreading and are persistent. The species is 30-flowered with flowers branching from up to three nodes. The flowers are 4–8 mm (0.16–0.31 in) in diameter and their petals are bright yellow or orange. The species' stamens number 5–30 in irregular groups or in five groups when few in number. Its seeds are approximately 50 mm (2.0 in) long.

The species flowers primarily from October–March.

The seeds of H. japonicum closely resemble those of the extinct paleospecies Hypericum tertiaerum.

== Distribution ==
The species is found across the Indian subcontinent, China, Southeast Asia, and Oceania. It has been recorded as occurring in Hawaii, however it was determined that this was an error.

=== Full distribution listing ===
- Australia
- Bangladesh
- Bhutan
- China
- India
- Indonesia
- Japan
- Korea
- Laos
- Malaysia
- Myanmar
- Nepal
- New Guinea
- New Zealand
- Philippines
- Sri Lanka
- Thailand
- Vietnam
