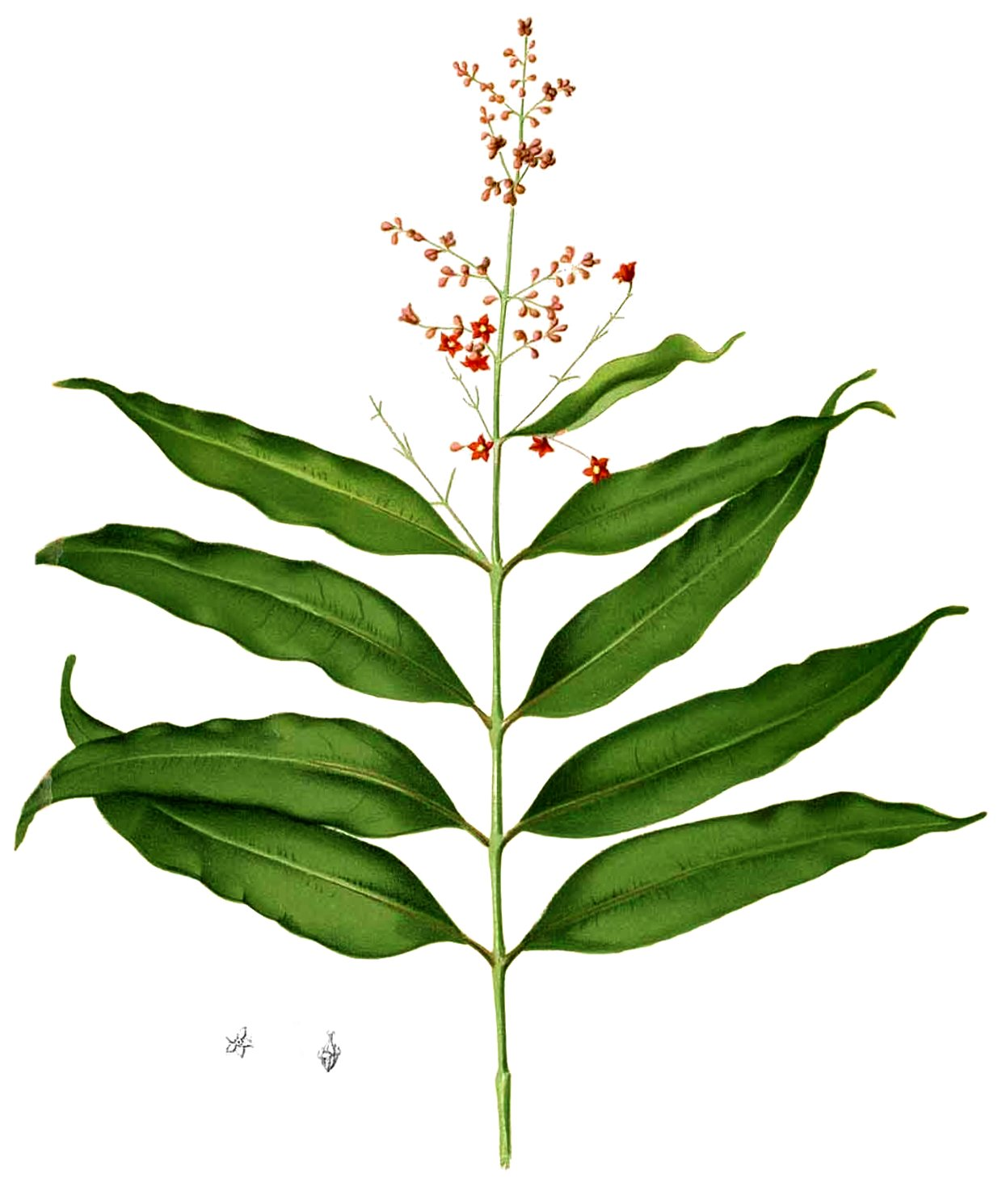

Conservation status
- Least Concern (IUCN 3.1)

Scientific classification
- Kingdom: Plantae
- Clade: Tracheophytes
- Clade: Angiosperms
- Clade: Eudicots
- Clade: Rosids
- Order: Malpighiales
- Family: Hypericaceae
- Genus: Cratoxylum
- Species: C. sumatranum

Binomial name
- Cratoxylum sumatranum (Jack) Blume

Subspecies
- Cratoxylum sumatranum subsp. blancoi (Blume) Gogelein; Cratoxylum sumatranum subsp. sumatranum

Synonyms
- Elodea sumatrana Jack; subsp. blancoi: Hypericum coccineum Wall.; Cratoxylum blancoi Blume; Ancistrolobus micradenius Turcz.; Caopia arborescens Kuntze; Cratoxylum punctulatum Elmer ex Merr.; subsp. sumatranum: Cratoxylum hornschuchii Blume; Hornschuchia hypericina Blume; Cratoxylum celebicum Blume; Cratoxylum clandestinum Blume; Cratoxylum racemosum Blume; Ancistrolobus floribundus Turcz.; Cratoxylum floribundum (Turcz.) Fern.-Vill.; Cratoxylum hypericinum (Blume) Merr.; Cratoxylum arboreum Elmer

= Cratoxylum sumatranum =

Species of tree

Cratoxylum sumatranum is a species of flowering plant in the Hypericaceae family. Found in Southeast Asia, it grows up to 51 m (167 ft) tall and is harvested locally for timber and fuel.

== Description ==
The tree may grow up to 51 m (167 ft) tall and 80 cm (31 in) diameter at breast height, with cracked and fissured bark. The stems produce whitish-yellowish latex. The leaves have an opposite arrangement, are simple, elliptic and a glossy rich green. Its flowers are 5-parted and clustered on terminal panicles. They are small (approximately 8mm in diameter), reddish with white linings around the petals. The fruits, which appear in July, are approximately 8mm long, yellow-brown-black capsules, filled with many small winged seeds.

== Taxonomy ==
The species was originally placed in the defunct genus Elodes under the name Elodes sumatrana. It was moved into Cratoxylum as C. sumatranum in 1856 by Carl Ludwig Blume. Two subspecies are recorded:

- Cratoxylum sumatranum subsp. blancoi (Blume) Gogelein - Philippines
- Cratoxylum sumatranum subsp. sumatranum - the nominate infraspecific - Malesia

== Distribution and habitat ==
Cratoxylum sumatranum is indigenous to Southeast Asia, including Borneo, Malaya, and the Philippines. It is found in disturbed open areas, especially on hillsides and ridges on clay or sandy soils.

== Uses ==
The plant is harvested locally and used for its timber and for fuel or charcoal. A 2021 study demonstrated that bark extracts from the species exhibited antimalarial capabilities in a laboratory setting, and could have applications as an antimalarial drug.
