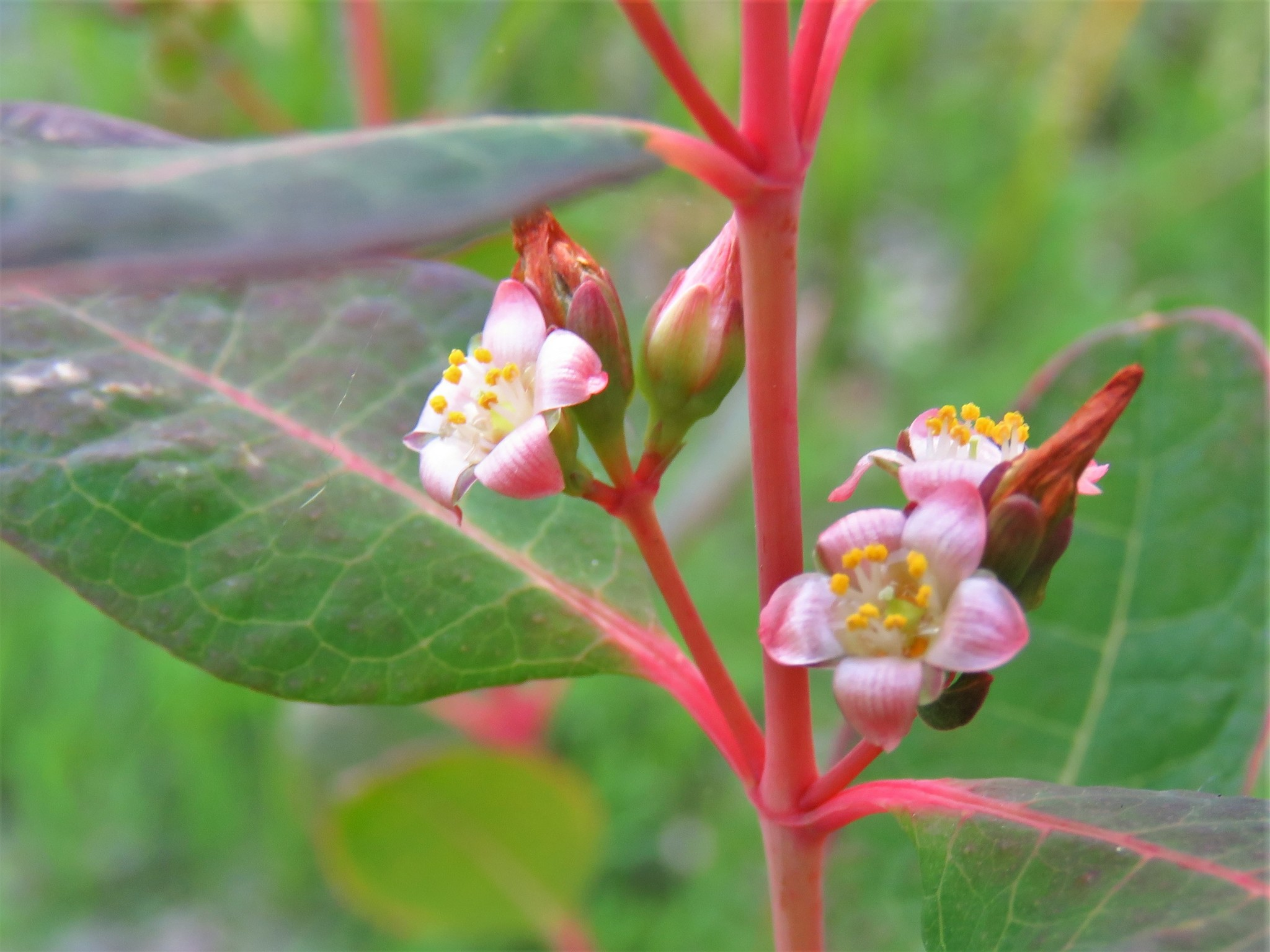
- At Tyler State Park in Smith County, Texas

Scientific classification
- Kingdom: Plantae
- Clade: Tracheophytes
- Clade: Angiosperms
- Clade: Eudicots
- Clade: Rosids
- Order: Malpighiales
- Family: Hypericaceae
- Genus: Hypericum
- Section: Hypericum sect. Elodea
- Species: H. walteri

Binomial name
- Hypericum walteri J.F.Gmel.

= Hypericum walteri =

Species of flowering plant

Hypericum walteri, the greater marsh St. Johnswort or Walter's marsh St. John's Wort, is a flowering plant endemic to the eastern United States, from Texas to Delaware north to Illinois. It grows along waterbodies such as lakes and streams, in marshes, and in swamp forests.

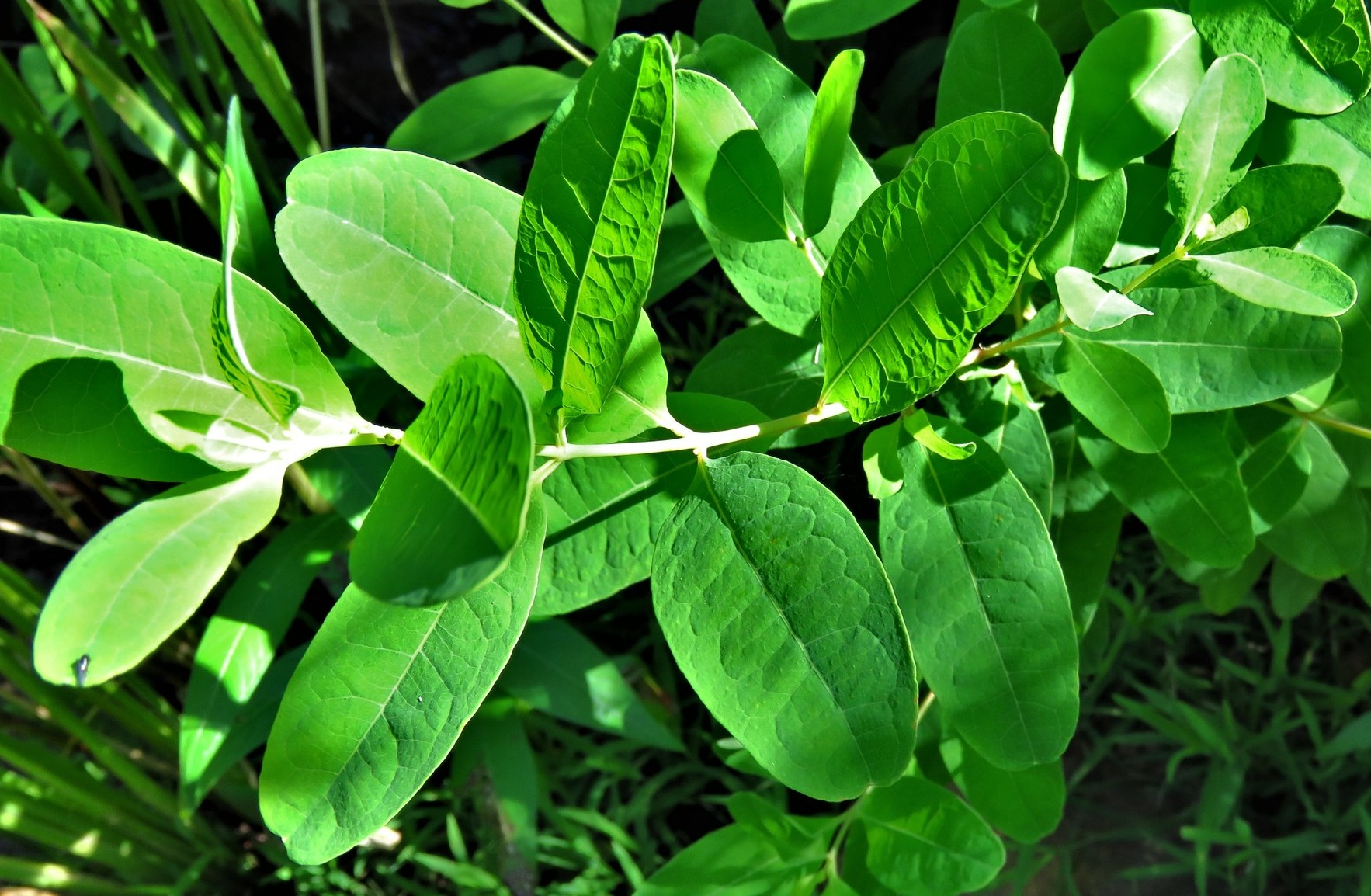
Leaves
