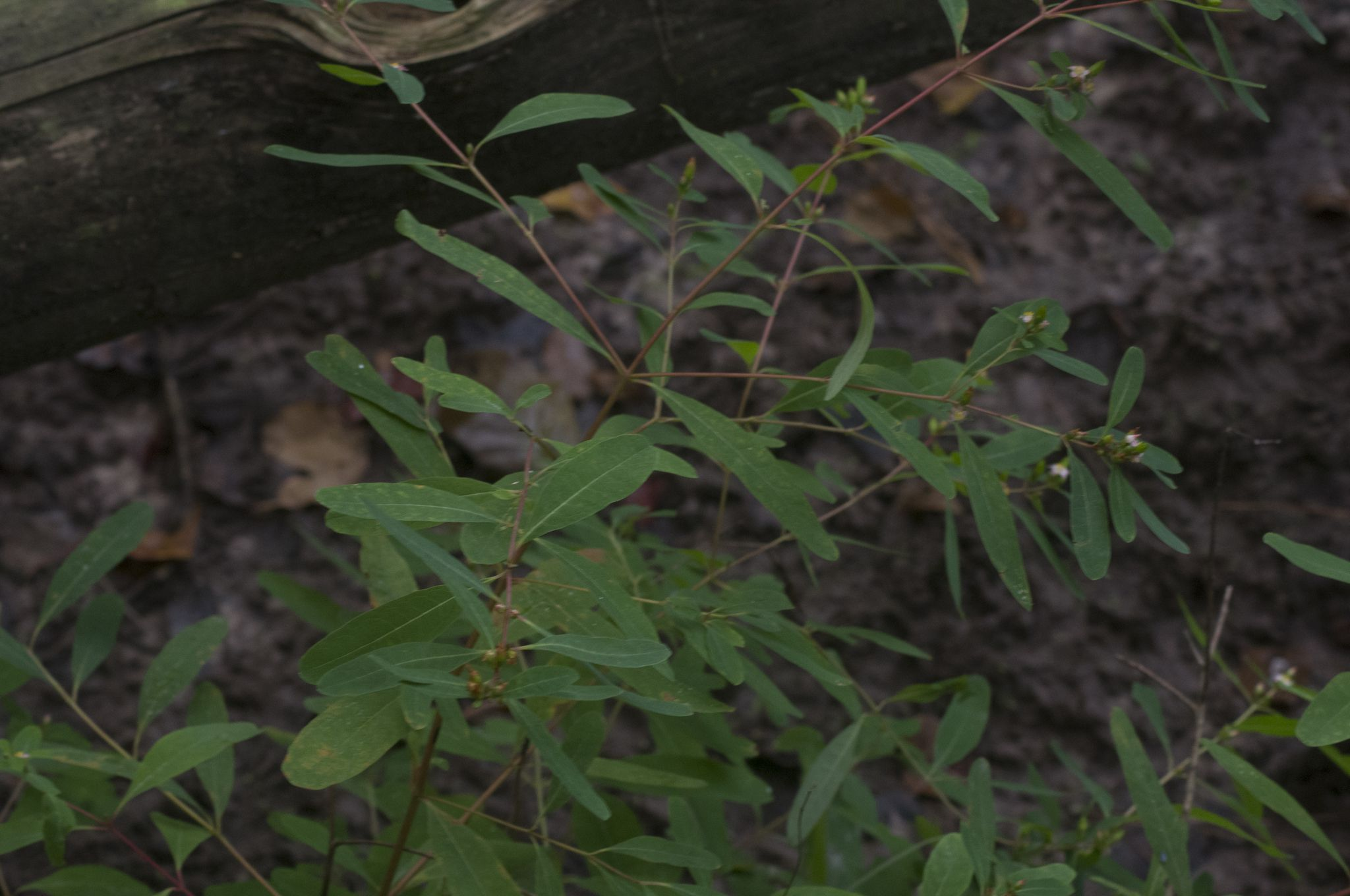

Scientific classification
- Kingdom: Plantae
- Clade: Tracheophytes
- Clade: Angiosperms
- Clade: Eudicots
- Clade: Rosids
- Order: Malpighiales
- Family: Hypericaceae
- Genus: Hypericum
- Species: H. tubulosum

Binomial name
- Hypericum tubulosum Walter

Synonyms
- Triadenum tubulosum (Walter) Gleason; Triadenum longifolium Small

= Hypericum tubulosum =

Species of flowering plant

Hypericum tubulosum, the lesser marsh St. Johnswort or southern marsh St. John's-wort, is a species of flowering plant in the family Hypericaceae. Formerly classified as synonym Triadenum tubulosum, the species is found across the Southern United States and Midwest. It grows in wetlands such as bogs and floodplains.

== Description ==
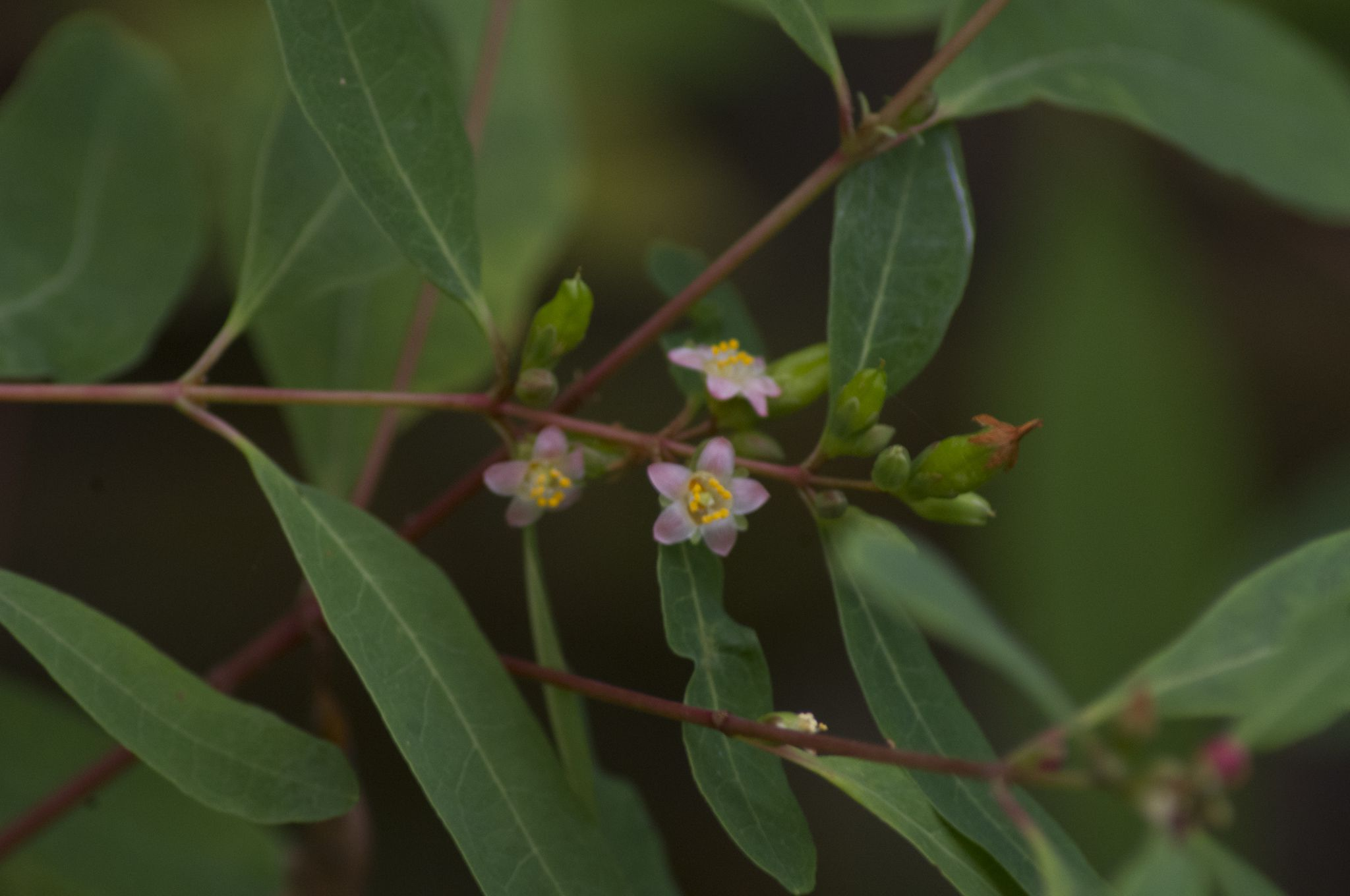
Flower detail

Lesser marsh St. Johnswort is a perennial herb that grows to approximately 32 inches (81 cm) tall. Its pink flowers bloom in August and September.

The seeds of H. tubulosum closely resemble those of the extinct paleospecies Hypericum tertiaerum.
