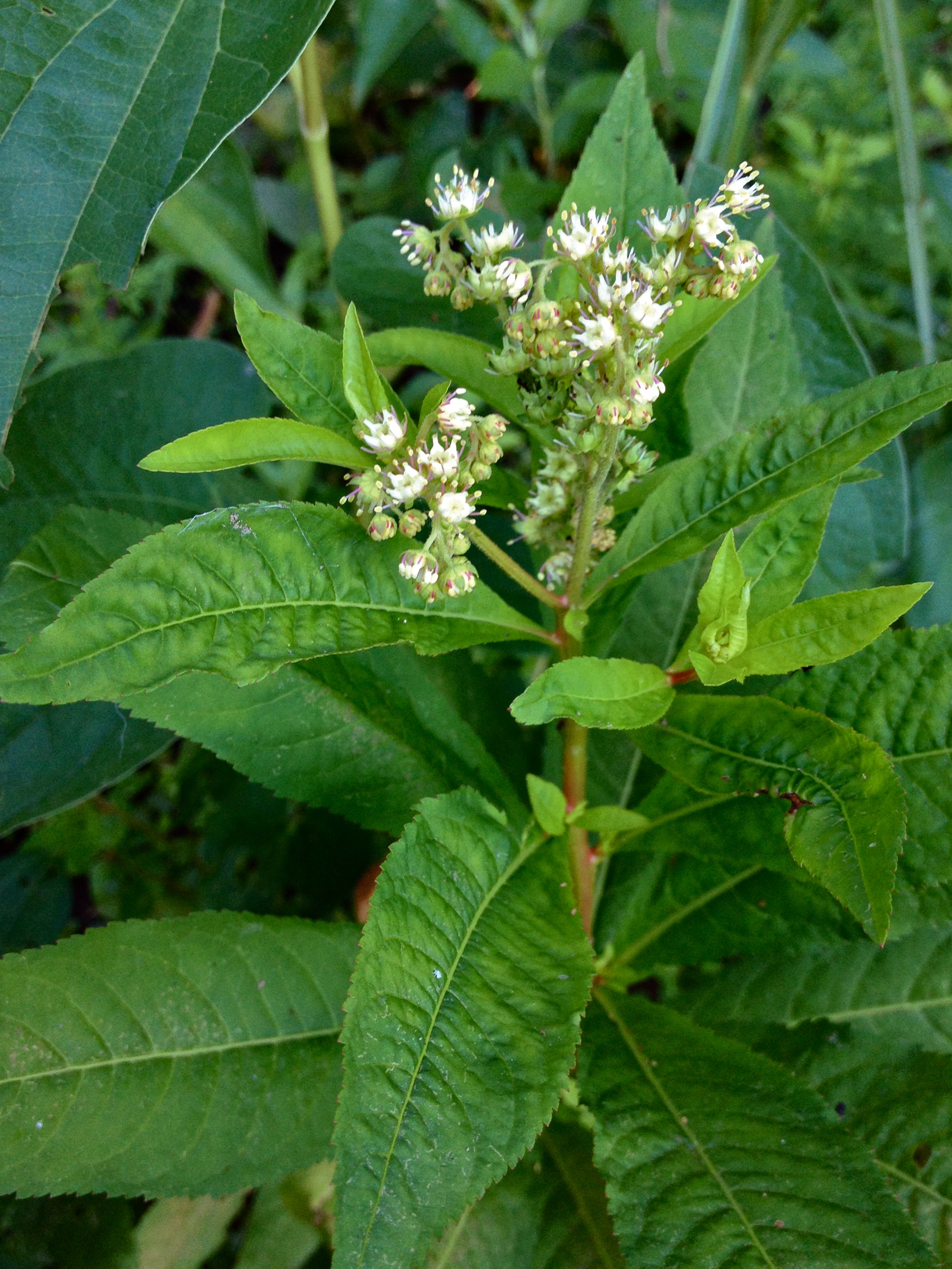

Conservation status
- Least Concern (IUCN 3.1)

Scientific classification
- Kingdom: Plantae
- Clade: Tracheophytes
- Clade: Angiosperms
- Clade: Eudicots
- Order: Saxifragales
- Family: Penthoraceae
- Genus: Penthorum
- Species: P. sedoides

Binomial name
- Penthorum sedoides L.

= Penthorum sedoides =

Species of flowering plant

Penthorum sedoides, known by the common name ditch stonecrop, is a perennial forb native to the eastern United States and Canada which produces small white flowers in summer.

== Description ==
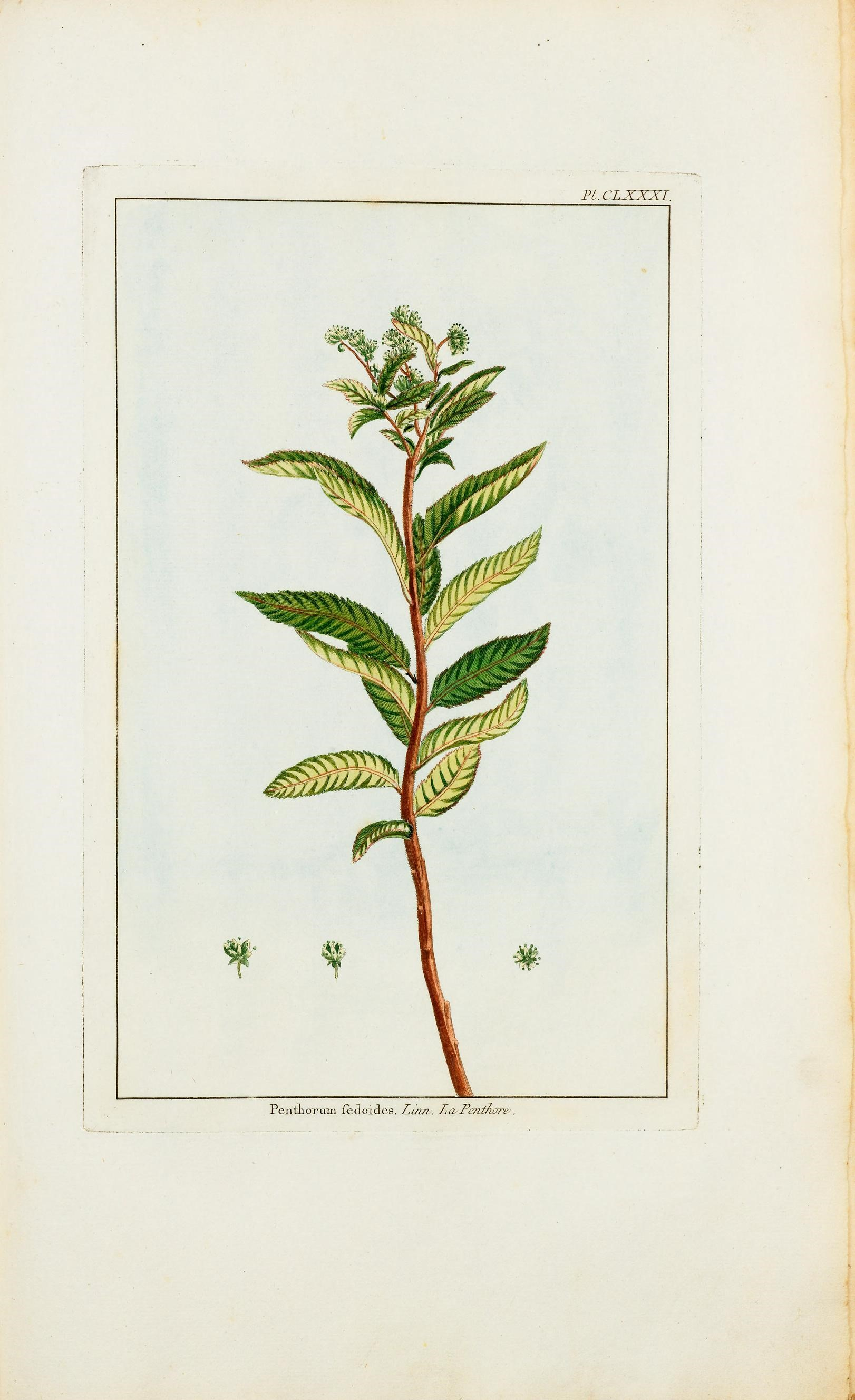
Botanical illustration of Penthorum sedoides.

Penthorum sedoides is 10 to 80 centimeters tall. The erect lower portion of the stem is smooth, but the curved branching inflorescence is covered in glandular hairs. The lanceolate finely serrated leaves are 2 to 18 centimeters long, and 0.5 to 5.5 centimeters wide. The flowers are about half a centimeter wide, with 10 stamens and no petals. The fruit is a star shaped capsule consisting of 5 carpels united at the base, which turns red in autumn.

== Distribution and habitat ==
Penthorum sedoides is widely distributed in the United States and Canada. It has been recorded in most states excepting western ones. Similarly, in Canada it has been recorded in the eastern provinces of Manitoba, New Brunswick, Ontario, and Quebec, as well as in British Columbia. It is listed as a species of special concern by the state of Rhode Island. Penthorum sedoides is only native to the eastern half of the continent, in the Pacific Northwest it is an introduced species found in commercial cranberry bogs. In Virginia, Penthorum sedoides grows in habitats such as alluvial swamps, floodplain pools, rocky or sandy shores, fens, marshes, beaver ponds, and disturbed wetlands.
