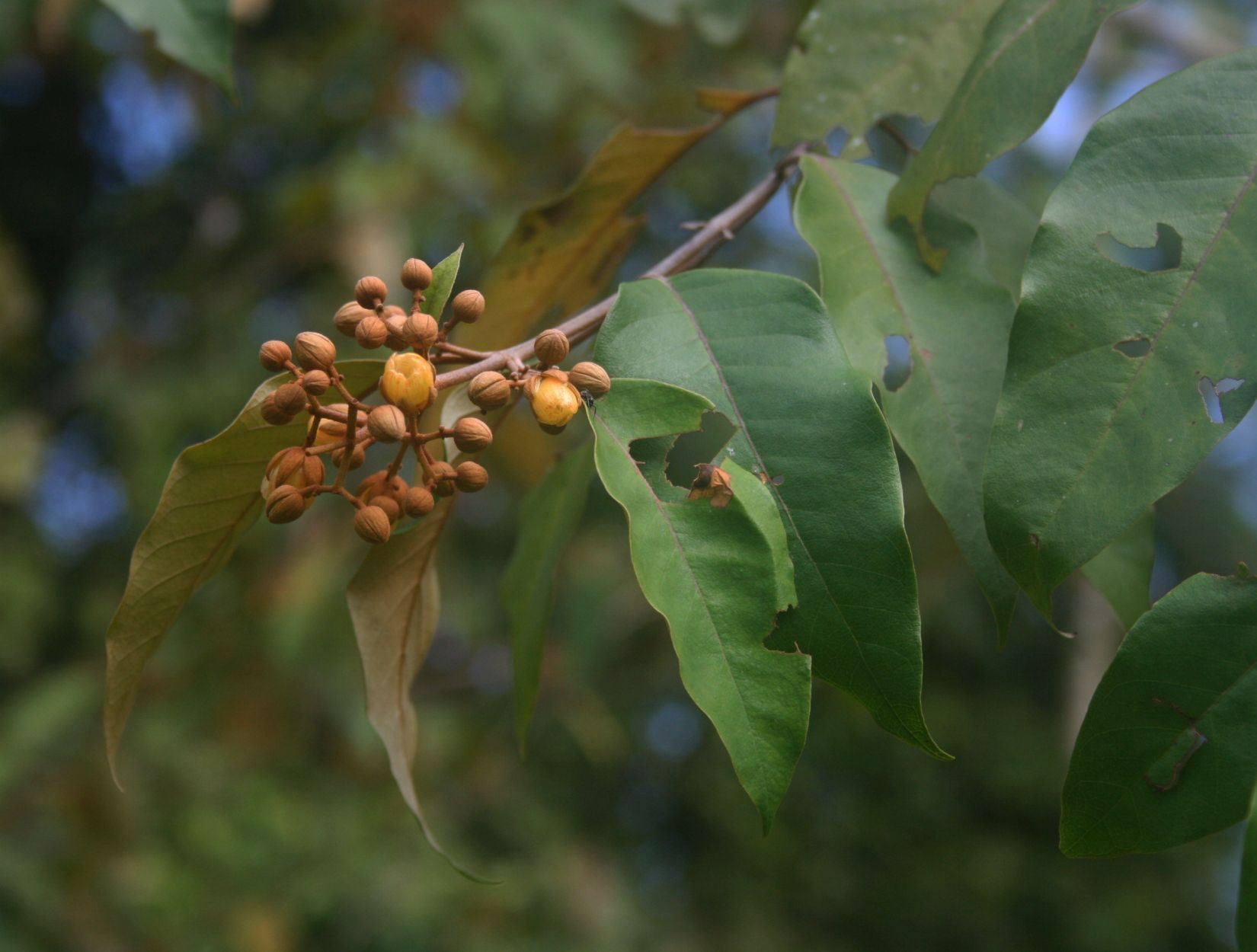
- Vismia baccifera

Scientific classification
- Kingdom: Plantae
- Clade: Tracheophytes
- Clade: Angiosperms
- Clade: Eudicots
- Clade: Rosids
- Order: Malpighiales
- Family: Hypericaceae
- Tribe: Vismieae
- Genus: Vismia; Vand.

Synonyms
- Acrossanthes C.Presl; Caopia Adans.

= Vismia =

Genus of flowering plants

Vismia is a genus of flowering plants in the family Hypericaceae. Members of the genus are small trees and shrubs found in tropical and subtropical areas of Central America and South America. Including the countries of Belize, Bolivia, Brazil, Colombia, Costa Rica, Ecuador, El Salvador, French Guiana, Guatemala, Guyana, Honduras, Mexico, Nicaragua, Panamá, Peru, Suriname, Trinidad-Tobago and Venezuela.

Like many members of the Hypericaceae, these plants contain xanthonoids.

The genus name of Vismia is in honour of Gérard de Visme (c. 1725 – c. 1797), a French and English merchant in Lisbon, Portugal. It was first described and published by Domenico Vandelli in Fl. Lusit. Bras. Spec. on page 51 in 1788.

== Species ==
Plants of the World Online accepts 46 species.

- Vismia atlantica L.Marinho & M.V.Martins
- Vismia baccifera (L.) Planch. & Triana
- Vismia bemerguii M.E.Berg
- Vismia billbergiana Beurl.
- Vismia brasiliensis Choisy
- Vismia camparaguey Sprague & L.Riley
- Vismia cauliflora A.C.Sm.
- Vismia cavalcantei Van den Berg
- Vismia cavanillesiana Cuatrec.
- Vismia cayennensis (Jacq.) Pers.
- Vismia conduplicata M.V.Martins & G.H.Shimizu
- Vismia confertiflora Spruce ex Reichardt
- Vismia crassa (Rusby) S.F.Blake
- Vismia cuatrecasasii Ewan
- Vismia ferruginea Kunth
- Vismia glabra Ruiz & Pav.
- Vismia gracilis Hieron.
- Vismia guianensis (Aubl.) Pers.
- Vismia japurensis Rchb.f.
- Vismia jefensis N.Robson
- Vismia laevis Planch. & Triana
- Vismia lateriflora Ducke
- Vismia latifolia (Aubl.) Choisy
- Vismia latisepala N.Robson
- Vismia lauriformis (Lam.) Choisy
- Vismia laxiflora Rchb.f.
- Vismia lindeniana Decne. ex Turcz.
- Vismia macrophylla Kunth
- Vismia magnoliifolia Cham. & Schltdl.
- Vismia mandurr Hieron.
- Vismia martiana Rchb.f.
- Vismia micrantha A.St.-Hil.
- Vismia minutiflora Ewan
- Vismia obtusa Spruce ex Reichardt
- Vismia pentagyna (Spreng.) Ewan
- Vismia plicatifolia Hochr.
- Vismia pozuzoensis Engl.
- Vismia ramuliflora Miq.
- Vismia rufa Cuatrec.
- Vismia rusbyi Ewan
- Vismia sandwithii Ewan
- Vismia sessilifolia (Aubl.) Choisy
- Vismia sprucei Sprague
- Vismia steyermarkii N.Robson
- Vismia tenuinervia (M.E.Berg) N.Robson
- Vismia tomentosa Rui

=== Formerly placed here ===
- Psorospermum febrifugum (as Vismia corymbosa A.Chev.)
- Psorospermum periclitatum Byng & Christenh. (as Vismia pauciflora Milne-Redh.)
- Psorospermum torrei (Mendes) Byng & Christenh. (as Vismia torrei Mendes)
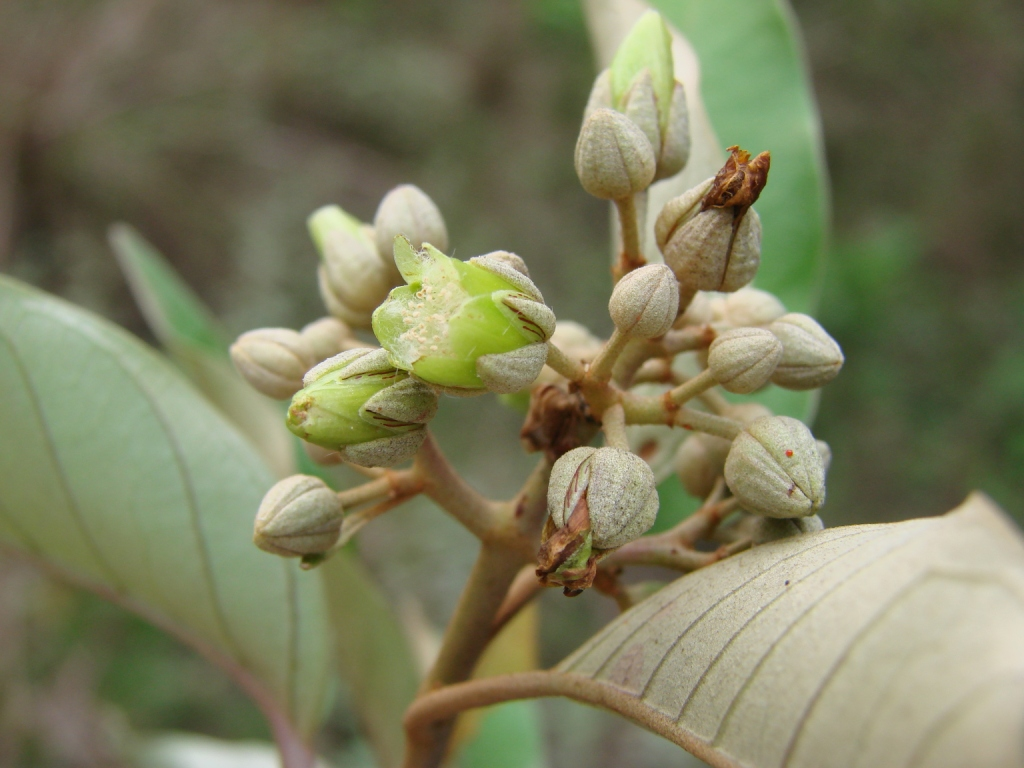
Vismia guianensis

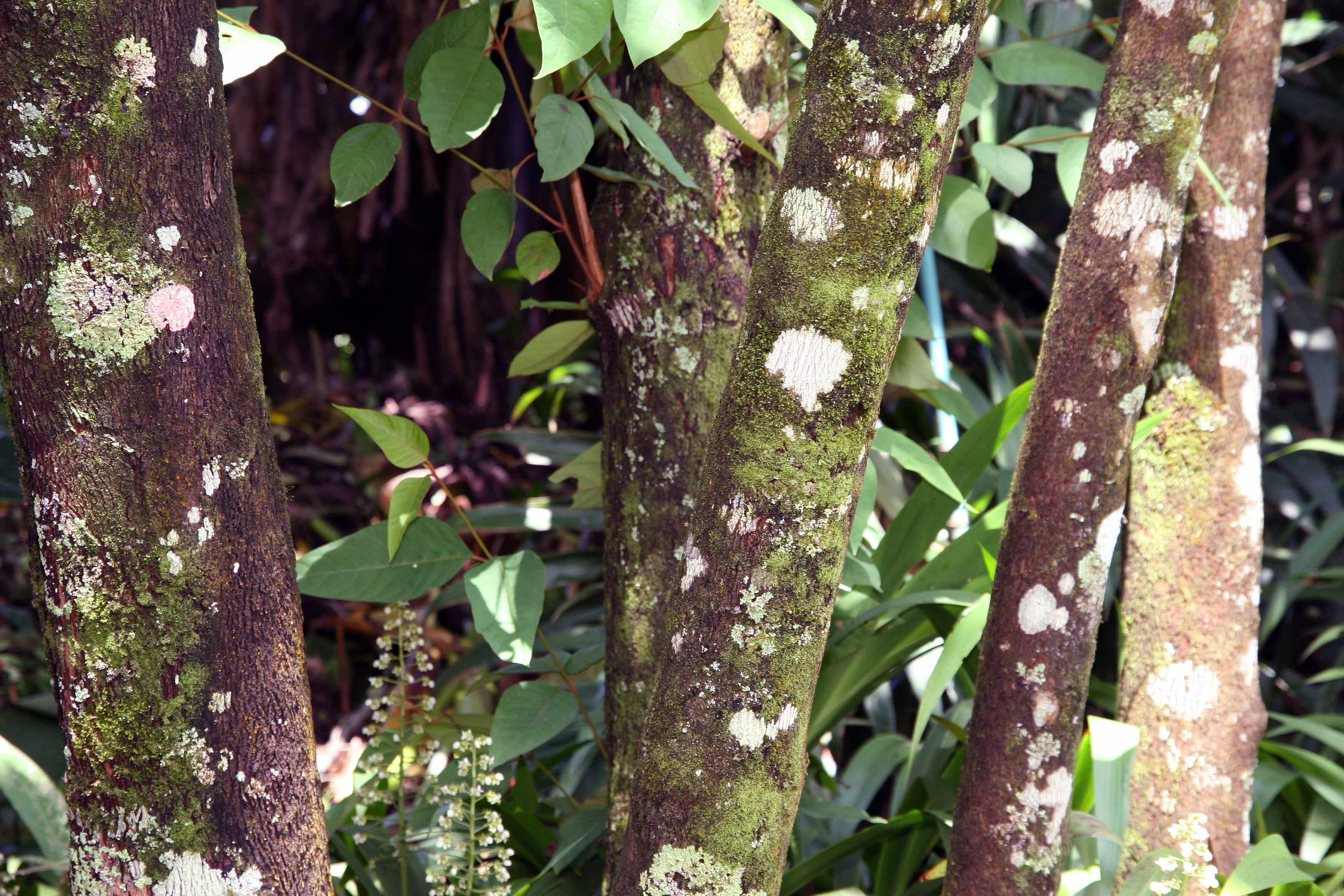
Vismia ferruginea
