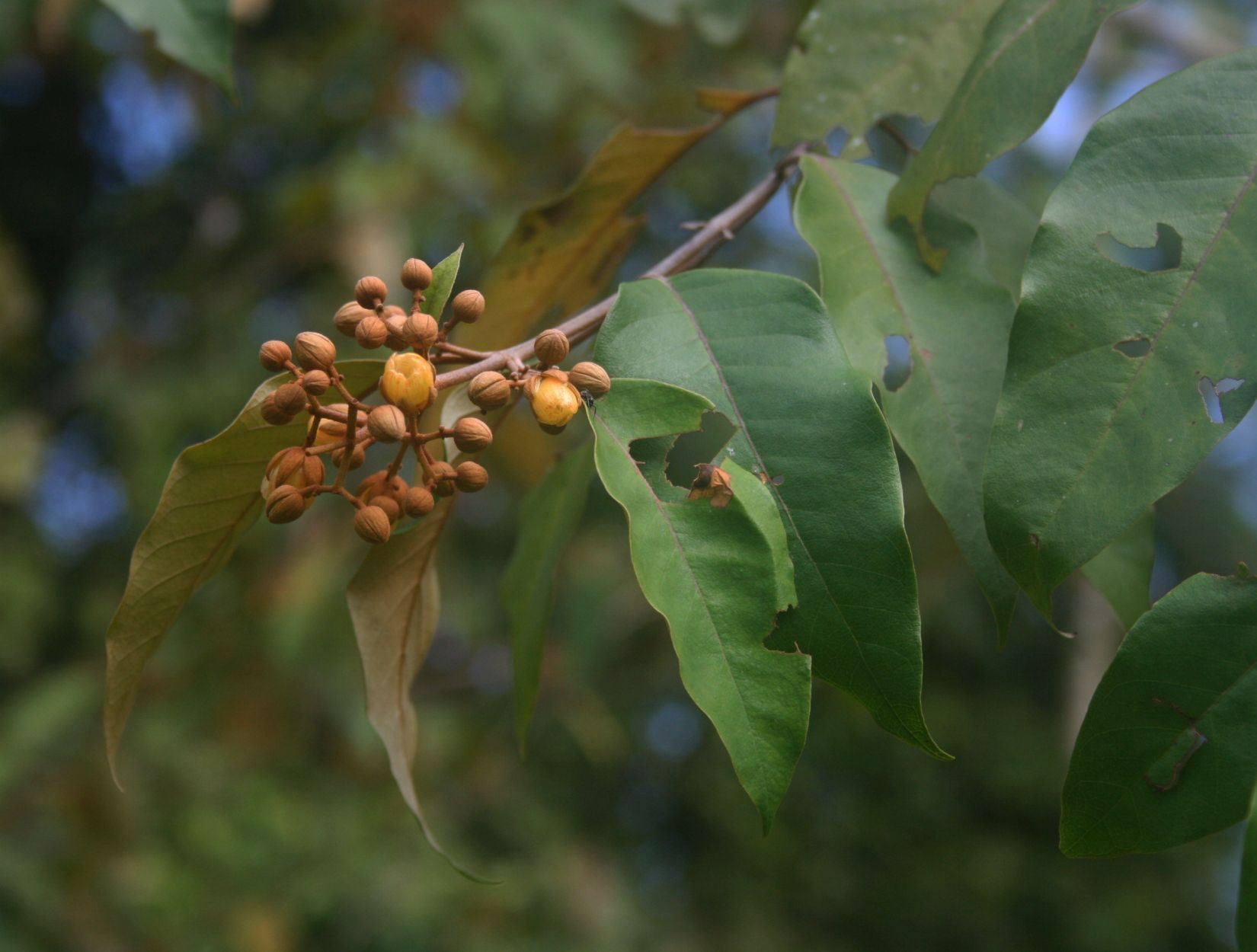
- Vismia baccifera

Scientific classification
- Kingdom: Plantae
- Clade: Tracheophytes
- Clade: Angiosperms
- Clade: Eudicots
- Clade: Rosids
- Order: Malpighiales
- Family: Hypericaceae
- Tribe: Vismieae; Vandelli, 1788

Genera
- Harungana Lam.; Psorospermum Spach.; Vismia Vand.

= Vismieae =

Tribe of flowering plants

Vismieae is a tribe of flowering plants within the St. John's wort family, Hypericaceae. It contains the genera Harungana, Psorospermum, and Vismia.
