= Hypericum bacciferum =

Hypericum bacciferum may refer to:

- Hypericum bacciferum Lam. = Hypericum androsaemum L.
- Hypericum bacciferum L. = Vismia baccifera (L.) Planch. & Triana
