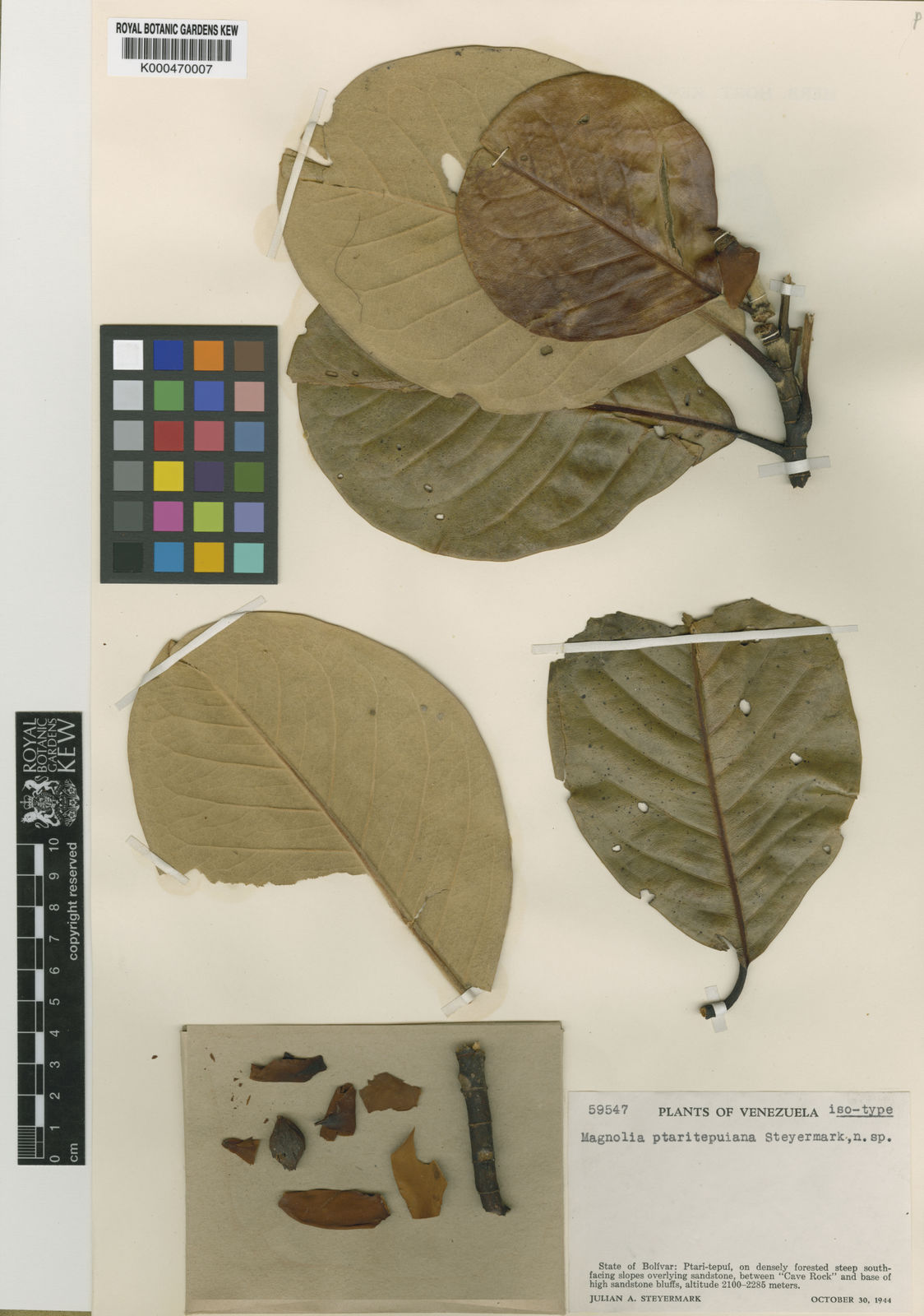

Conservation status
- Endangered (IUCN 3.1)

Scientific classification
- Kingdom: Plantae
- Clade: Embryophytes
- Clade: Tracheophytes
- Clade: Spermatophytes
- Clade: Angiosperms
- Clade: Magnoliids
- Order: Magnoliales
- Family: Magnoliaceae
- Genus: Magnolia
- Section: Magnolia sect. Talauma
- Subsection: Magnolia subsect. Dugandiodendron
- Species: M. ptaritepuiana

Binomial name
- Magnolia ptaritepuiana Steyerm. (1951)

Synonyms
- Dugandiodendron ptaritepuianum (Steyerm.) Lozano (1975); Dugandiodendron roraimae (Steyerm.) Sima & Hong Yu (2021); Magnolia roraimae Steyerm. (1951)

= Magnolia ptaritepuiana =

Species of flowering plant

Magnolia ptaritepuiana is a species of flowering plant in the family Magnoliaceae. It is endemic to the tepuis, flat-topped mountains in southern Venezuela and southwestern Guyana.

== Description ==
Magnolia ptaritepuiana is a tree which grows up to 20 meters tall.

== Range and habitat ==
Magnolia ptaritepuiana is known from five locations, including on the Ptari-tepui, Mount Roraima, and Sierra de Maigualida in southern Venezuela, and in the adjacent Cuyuni-Mazaruni region of Guyana. The species' estimated area of occupancy (AOO) is 16 km^{2} and its estimated extent of occurrence (EOO) is 28,853.27 km^{2}.

It grows in dense montane tepui forests on sandstone soils, together with species of Vismia and Euterpe, between 1,600 and 2,300 meters elevation.

== Conservation ==
The species' conservation status is assessed as endangered. It has a limited range, and is threatened with habitat loss and degradation from mining and poorly controlled tourism. Accelerating climate change could disrupt the montane climate of its native region and further endanger the species.
