= Harungana montana =

Conservation status
- Vulnerable (IUCN 3.1)

Scientific classification
- Kingdom: Plantae
- Clade: Tracheophytes
- Clade: Angiosperms
- Clade: Eudicots
- Clade: Rosids
- Order: Malpighiales
- Family: Hypericaceae
- Genus: Harungana
- Species: H. montana

Binomial name
- Harungana montana Spirlet

Species of flowering plant

Harungana montana is a species of tree in the family Hypericaceae.

== Description ==
The species is a tree that grows to 15–20 metres (49–66 ft) tall, with tomentose young branches and leaves.

== Taxonomy ==
Harungana montana was first described by botanist Marie-Louise Spirlet in 1959. It is one of three species in the genus Harungana, with the others being Harungana madagascariensis and Harungana rubescens. Sometimes the genus is considered monotypic, with only H. madagascariensis being accepted.

== Distribution, habitat, and ecology ==
Harungana montana is a pioneer species, and can be found in rainforests at altitudes of 2,000–3,000 metres (6,600–9,800 ft) in the Democratic Republic of the Congo, Rwanda, and Burundi. It is endemic to the Albertine Rift montane forests.
