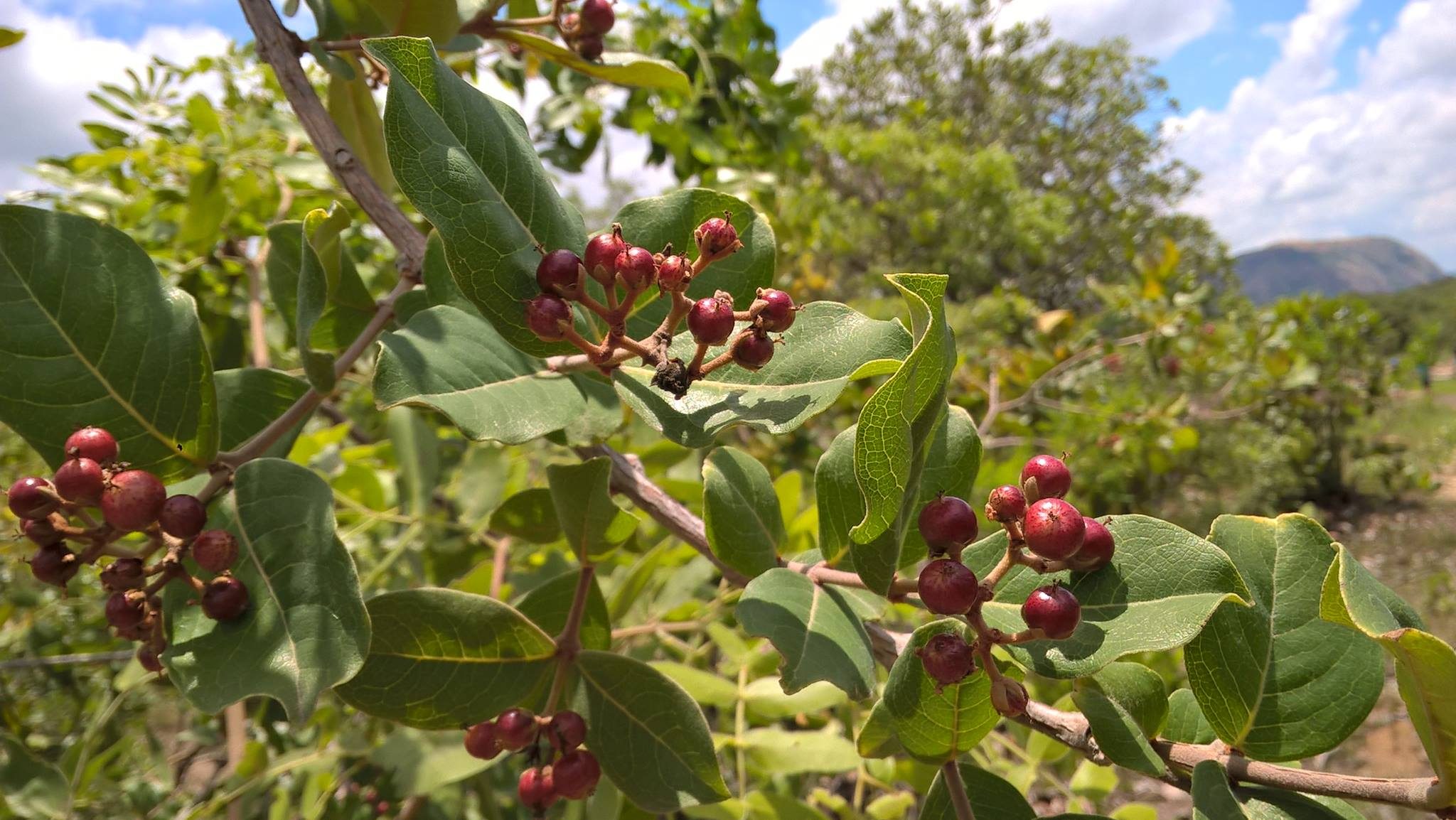

Conservation status
- Least Concern (IUCN 3.1)

Scientific classification
- Kingdom: Plantae
- Clade: Embryophytes
- Clade: Tracheophytes
- Clade: Angiosperms
- Clade: Eudicots
- Clade: Rosids
- Order: Malpighiales
- Family: Hypericaceae
- Genus: Psorospermum
- Species: P. febrifugum

Binomial name
- Psorospermum febrifugum Spach

Synonyms
- Haronga febrifuga (Spach) Steud.; Psorospermum ferrugineum Hook.f.; Hypericum afzelii Purdie ex Turcz.; Psorospermum afzelii Turcz.; Psorospermum tenuifolium Kotschy; Psorospermum niloticum Kotschy ex Schweinf.; Psorospermum febrifugum var. albidum Oliv.; Psorospermum febrifugum var. glabrum Oliv.; Psorospermum albidum (Oliv.) Engl.; Psorospermum salicifolium Engl.; Psorospermum campestre Engl.; Psorospermum stuhlmannii Engl.; Psorospermum stuhlmannii var. cuneifolium Engl.; Psorospermum febrifugum f. latifolium De Wild.; Psorospermum chariense A.Chev.; Vismia corymbosa A.Chev.; Psorospermum microphyllum A.Chev.; Psorospermum floribundum Hutch. & Dalziel; Psorospermum angustifolium Spirlet; Psorospermum baumannii Engl.; Psorospermum corymbosellum Spirlet; Psorospermum corymbosum Spirlet; Psorospermum discolor Spirlet; Psorospermum ellipticum Spirlet; Psorospermum febrifugum var. ferrugineum (Hook.f.) Keay & Milne-Redh.; Psorospermum gillardinii Spirlet; Psorospermum kaniamae Spirlet; Psorospermum kisantuense Spirlet; Psorospermum lanceolatum Spirlet; Psorospermum leopoldvilleanum Spirlet; Psorospermum macrophyllum Spirlet; Psorospermum magniflorum Spirlet; Psorospermum mahagiense Spirlet; Psorospermum mossoense Spirlet; Psorospermum nigrum Spirlet; Psorospermum orbiculare Spirlet; Psorospermum ovatum Spirlet; Psorospermum pauciflorum Spirlet; Psorospermum pectinatum Spirlet; Psorospermum pubescens Spirlet; Psorospermum rotundatifolium Spirlet; Psorospermum stanerianum Spirlet; Psorospermum uelense Spirlet; Psorospermum victoranum Spirlet

= Psorospermum febrifugum =

Species of flowering plant

Psorospermum febrifugum is a species of flowering plant in the family Hypericaceae. It is found across tropical Africa in seasonally dry tropical biomes. French botanist Édouard Spach described Psorospermum febrifugum in 1836.

== Description ==
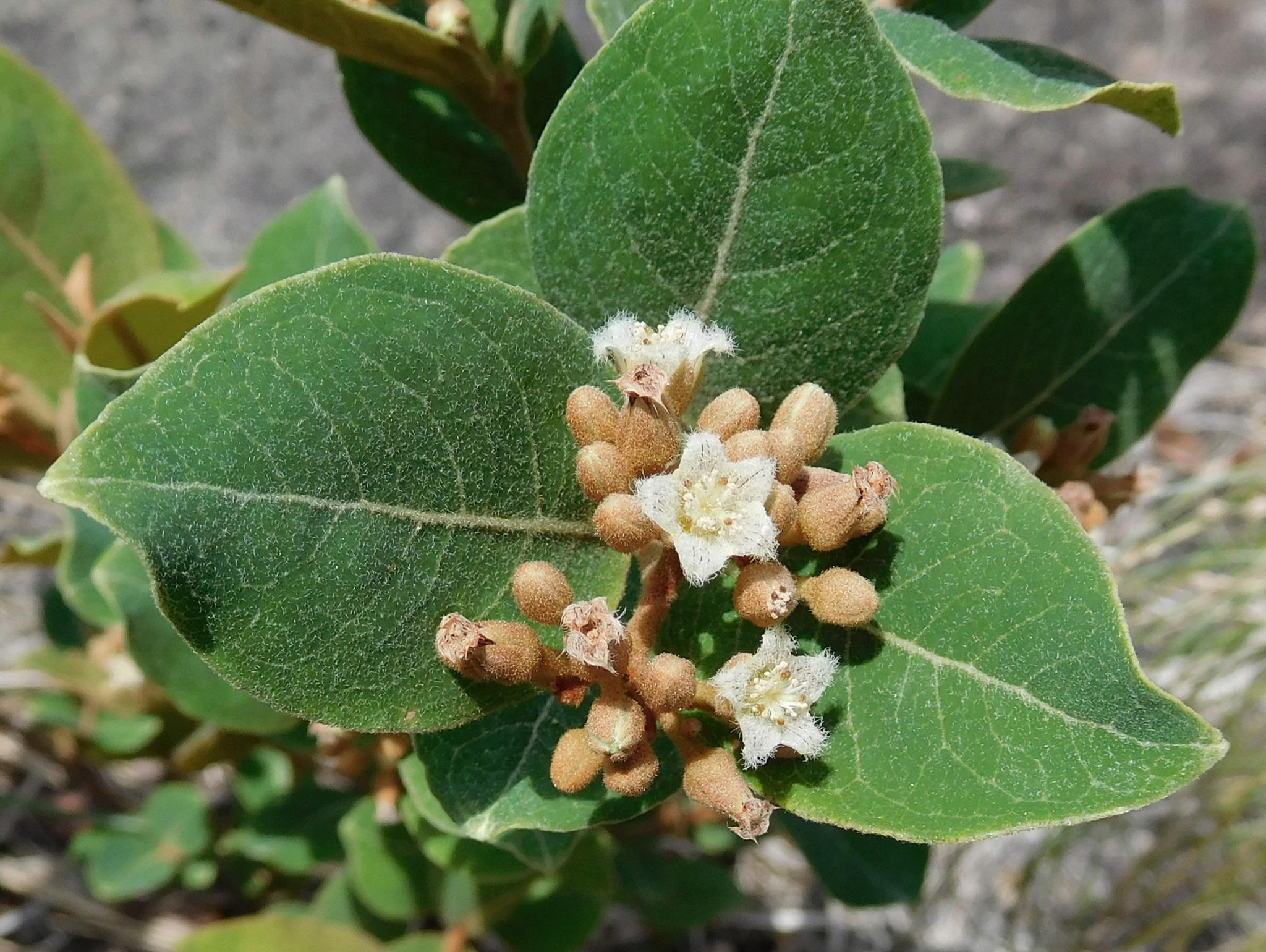
Inflorescence of Psorospermum febrifugum

Psorospermum febrifugum grows as a tree or shrub up to 2 meters (6 ft 7 in) tall. The leaves are directly attached to the stems or have a very short leaf stalk, and are opposite one another. The flowers are covered in fine hairs, with many flowers clustered together on the ends of branches. When the fruit matures, many bunches of dark red berries can be seen.

A phytochemical assay of the species in 1980 isolated a new xanthone that was named psorospermin. Later studies determined that P. febrifugum had a wide array of chemicals like alkaloids, flavonoids, phenols, and tannins; the species also has higher quantities and densities of these chemicals than Harungana madagascariensis, another member of Hypericaceae with known medicinal qualities.

== Uses ==
Psorospermum febrifugum has been used as a febrifuge, leprosy treatment, antidote, and purgative. As an ethnomedicine in Tanzania and among the Baganda people of Uganda, it has also been used to treat epilepsy, pneumonia, and tuberculosis. A 1972 study demonstrated that ethanol extracts of the plant exhibited activity in a laboratory setting against leukemia in mice and a human cell line.
