= Vismia jefensis =

Conservation status
- Least Concern (IUCN 3.1)

Scientific classification
- Kingdom: Plantae
- Clade: Tracheophytes
- Clade: Angiosperms
- Clade: Eudicots
- Clade: Rosids
- Order: Malpighiales
- Family: Hypericaceae
- Genus: Vismia
- Species: V. jefensis

Binomial name
- Vismia jefensis N. Robson

Species of flowering plant

Vismia jefensis is a species of flowering plant in the Hypericaceae family. It is found only in Panama. It is threatened by habitat loss.
