= Vismia mandurr =

Scientific classification
- Kingdom: Plantae
- Clade: Tracheophytes
- Clade: Angiosperms
- Clade: Eudicots
- Clade: Rosids
- Order: Malpighiales
- Family: Hypericaceae
- Genus: Vismia
- Species: V. mandurr

Binomial name
- Vismia mandurr Hieron.

Synonyms
- Caopia mandurr Hieron.; Vismia lehmannii Hieron.

Species of plant

Vismia mandurr, the mancharropa or puntelanza, is a species of flowering plant in the family Hypericaceae, native to Colombia, Ecuador, and Peru. It is fed upon by Colombian woolly monkeys (Lagothrix lagothricha lugens).
