= Psorospermum androsaemifolium =

Scientific classification
- Kingdom: Plantae
- Clade: Embryophytes
- Clade: Tracheophytes
- Clade: Angiosperms
- Clade: Eudicots
- Clade: Rosids
- Order: Malpighiales
- Family: Hypericaceae
- Genus: Psorospermum
- Species: P. androsaemifolium

Binomial name
- Psorospermum androsaemifolium Baker

Species of flowering plant

Psorospermum androsaemifolium is a species of flowering plant in the family Hypericaceae. A shrub or tree, the species is found in a seasonally dry tropical habitat. It was described by John Gilbert Baker in 1882 and is found in the west and central regions of Madagascar, where it is known as tsifady, harongampanihy, fanerana and hazomafaika. The specific epithet androsaemifolium derives from Hypericum sect. Androsaemum and means "leaves like those of Androsaemum".

== Description ==
Psorospermum androsaemifolium is a shrub that grows 1.8–2.4 meters (5.9–7.9 ft) tall. There is a small amount of rust-colored hairs on the young branches. The leaves have a leaf stalk, are an oblong shape, and measure 5–7.5 centimeters (2.0–3.0 in) long. They have notched edges (crenulate) and are covered with many black glands. The flower clusters (inflorescences) are dense cymes with short, erect pedicels. The petals are a lance shape, with the point towards the base (oblanceolate), and are a yellow-white color with "conspicuous" black lines on their surface. The stamens are arranged in five bundles (fascicles); the ovary is globe-shaped and has five cells; the fruit is a yellow pea-sized berry that contains one or two seeds.

== Chemistry and uses ==
The triterpene chemicals amyrin and lupeol acetate have been isolated from the leaves and stem of the species. Also found in the leaves and stem are the flavonoids quercetin and acantophorin. Long-chain fats like 12-hentricontanol and hentricontane were found only in the leaves.

Psorospermum androsaemifolium has been used in traditional medicine to treat spider and insect bites, as well as stomach ailments. Some chemical constituents isolated from the species, including acanthophorin and vismiaquinone, have demonstrated minor antifungal and antibacterial properties in a laboratory setting.
