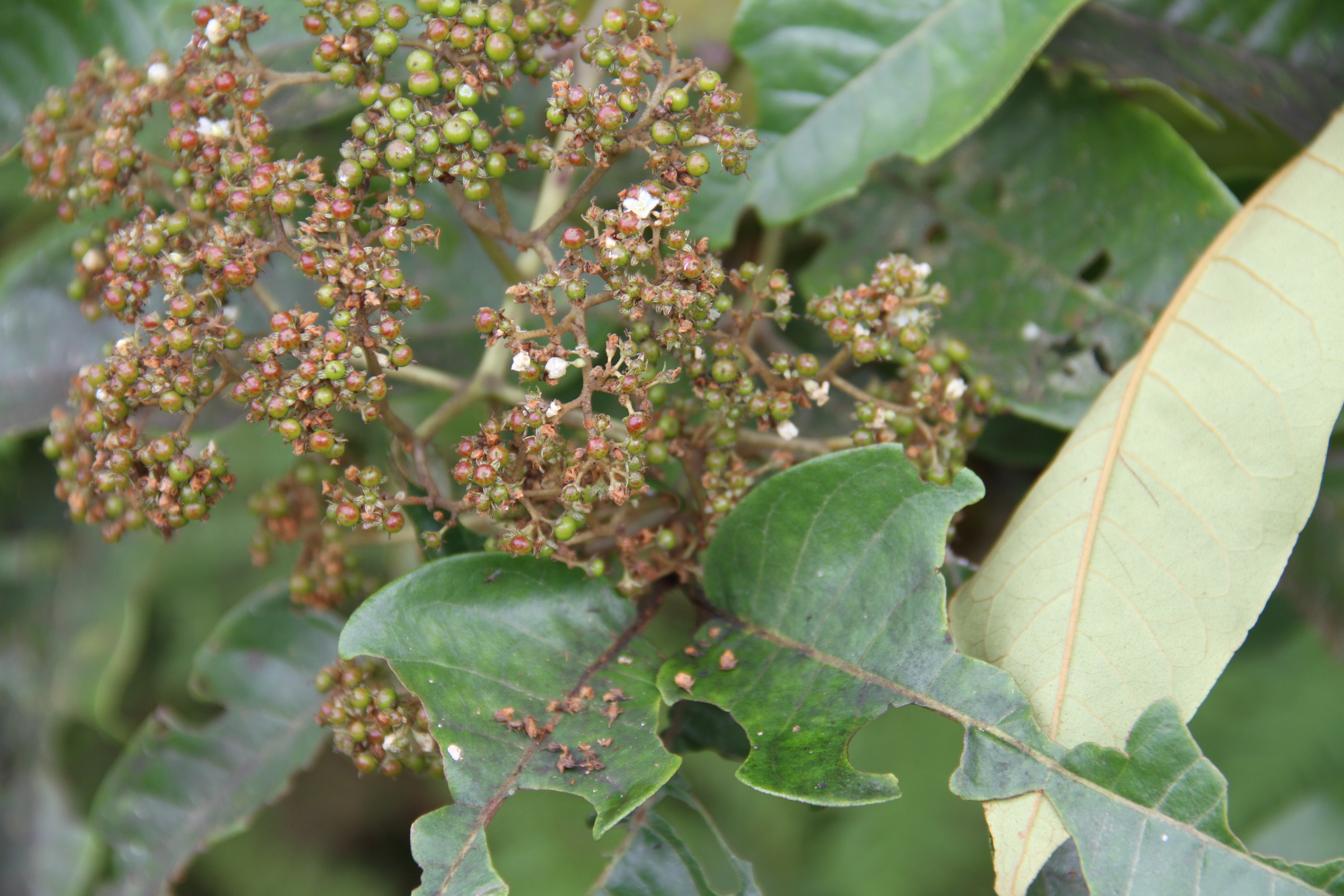
- Harungana madagascariensis

Scientific classification
- Kingdom: Plantae
- Clade: Tracheophytes
- Clade: Angiosperms
- Clade: Eudicots
- Clade: Rosids
- Order: Malpighiales
- Family: Hypericaceae
- Tribe: Vismieae
- Genus: Harungana; Lam.

Synonyms
- Arungana Pers.; Haemocarpus Noronha ex Spreng.; Haronga Thouars

= Harungana =

Genus of flowering plants

Harungana is a genus of flowering plants within the St. Johns wort family, Hypericaceae, native to tropical Africa and Madagascar, widely known for its diverse medicinal, ecological, and practical uses.

== Species ==
Plants of the World Online currently includes:

1. Harungana madagascariensis Lam. ex Poir.
2. Harungana montana Spirlet
3. Harungana rubescens (Oliv.) Byng & Christenh

== Distribution and habitat ==
Harungana can be found in medium to low altitudes around 1000-1600m above sea level in evergreen forest, usually around the forest margins and along river banks. It is widely distributed from South Africa to Sudan. It is often the first plant to be found in a forest that has been cleared. It can be found in both forest and savanna regions. It is native to Central African Republic, Congo, Democratic Republic of Congo, Eswatini, Ethiopia, Kenya, Lesotho, Madagascar, Namibia, Sierra Leone, South Africa, Sudan, Tanzania, and Uganda.

Harungana is an introduced genus, naturalized and brought to the Harvey Creek, Babinda, and Mirriwinni areas of Australia. Harungana has now become quite common in disturbed coastal lowland rainforest and has the capacity to spread widely.

== Traditional Uses ==
In traditional medicine, it is employed to treat a wide range of ailments such as skin diseases (including scabies, ringworm, and fungal infections), digestive disorders like diarrhea, dysentery, and jaundice, and respiratory conditions such as coughs, asthma, and chest pains. The plant is also used to treat fevers, malaria, river blindness, and urogenital infections like gonorrhea. Additionally, its gum and latex are applied to wounds to promote healing, while extracts are used to address anemia, hemorrhoids, irregular menstruation, and other reproductive health issues.

Beyond its medicinal applications, Harungana madagascariensis serves several practical functions. The tree is frequently used in agroforestry for reforestation, soil stabilization, and the regeneration of degraded lands, particularly following bushfires. Its leaves are used as fodder for goats and sheep, and its light wood is utilized for construction, firewood, and charcoal production. The plant’s brightly colored orang-red sap and latex are traditionally used as natural dyes for fabrics and as paint, and its bark and roots are chewed for dental hygiene. The fruit is edible and sometimes consumed fresh or fermented into local beverages; it also has mild laxative properties.

== Skincare Uses ==
Harungana's plant extracts are used as a natural retinol alternative in antiaging skincare. It is used in Clarins' Super Restorative and Nutri-Lumière lines and their Double Serum, Chanel's Sublimage line, Hero Cosmetics sunscreens, and iNNBEAUTY's serums.

An initial in vitro study showed that Harungana induces an overall retinol-like gene induction profile in fibroblasts and stimulation of protein synthesis in both fibroblasts and photoaged skin samples.

An in vivo blind clinical study of 50 people used a split-face design to compare skincare results. One side of each person’s face received a cream containing retinol, while the other side used a cream containing organic Harungana extract. After nearly 2 months of twice-daily application, the two sides showed identical improvement of wrinkles underneath the eyes, lower face ptosis, dark spots, smoothness, plumpness, firmness, and elasticity.
