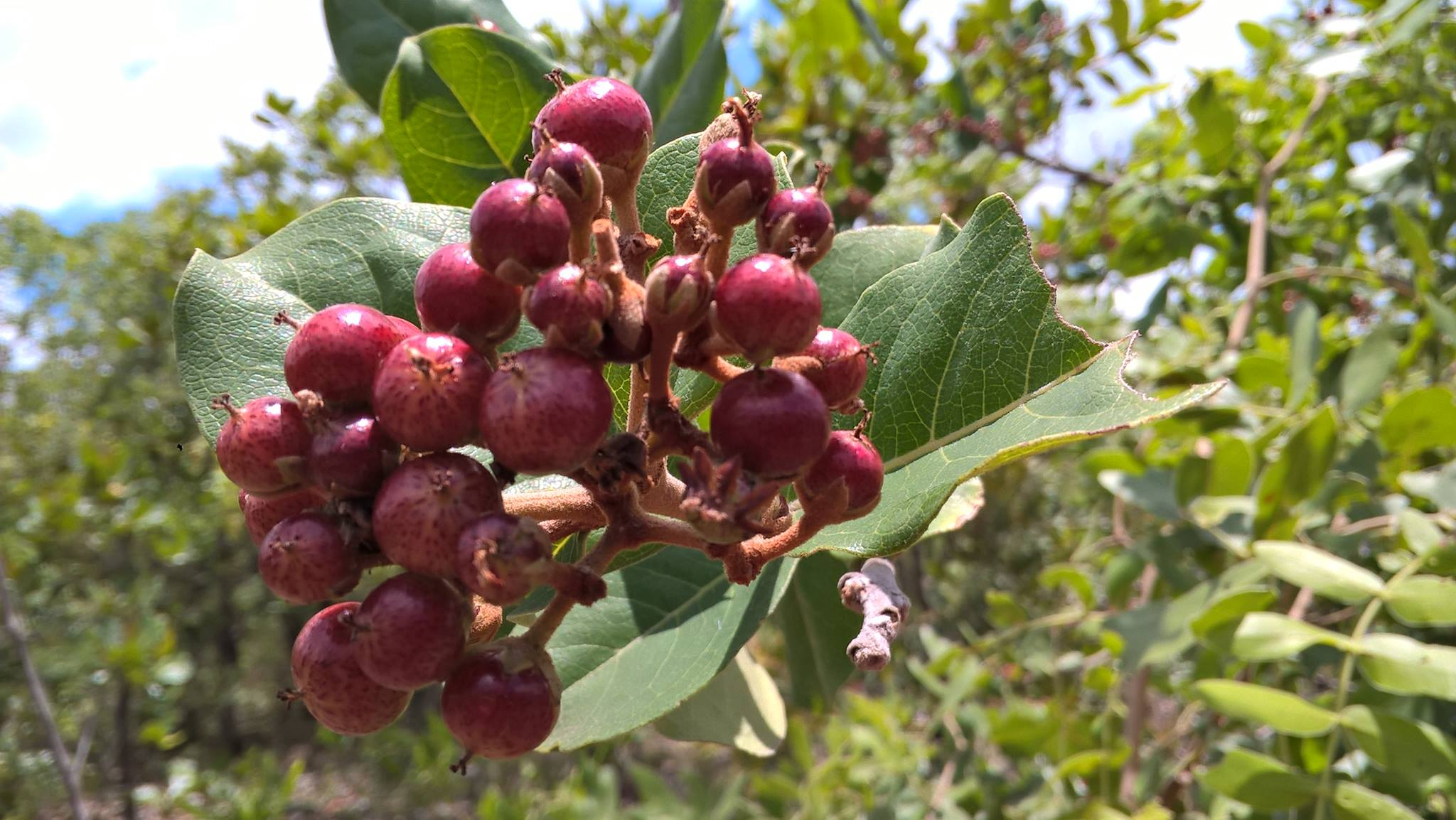
- Psorospermum febrifugum, also known as the "Christmas berry"

Scientific classification
- Kingdom: Plantae
- Clade: Embryophytes
- Clade: Tracheophytes
- Clade: Angiosperms
- Clade: Eudicots
- Clade: Rosids
- Order: Malpighiales
- Family: Hypericaceae
- Tribe: Vismieae
- Genus: Psorospermum; Spach

= Psorospermum =

Genus of flowering plants

Psorospermum is a genus of flowering plants in the family Hypericaceae. It includes 49 species native to tropical Africa and Madagascar.

== Species ==
The following species are recognized by Plants of the World Online as belonging to Psorospermum as of 2026.

- Psorospermum adamauense Engl.
- Psorospermum affine (Oliv.) Byng & Christenh.
- Psorospermum alternifolium Hook.f.
- Psorospermum androsaemifolium Baker
- Psorospermum atrorufum H.Perrier
- Psorospermum aurantiacum Engl.
- Psorospermum brachypodum Baker
- Psorospermum bullatum H.Perrier
- Psorospermum cerasifolium Baker
- Psorospermum chevalieri Hochr.
- Psorospermum chionanthifolium Spach
- Psorospermum cornifolium Spach
- Psorospermum corymbiferum Hochr.
- Psorospermum crenatum (Pers.) Hochr.
- Psorospermum densipunctatum Engl.
- Psorospermum fanerana Baker
- Psorospermum febrifugum Spach
- Psorospermum ferrovestitum Baker
- Psorospermum glaberrimum Hochr.
- Psorospermum glaucum Engl.
- Psorospermum guineense (L.) Hochr.
- Psorospermum humile H.Perrier
- Psorospermum lamianum H.Perrier
- Psorospermum lanatum Hochr.
- Psorospermum lanceolatum (Choisy) Drake
- Psorospermum laurentii (De Wild.) Byng & Christenh.
- Psorospermum malifolium Baker
- Psorospermum mechowii Engl.
- Psorospermum membranaceum C.H.Wright
- Psorospermum membranifolium Baker
- Psorospermum molluscum (Pers.) Hochr.
- Psorospermum nanum H.Perrier
- Psorospermum nervosum H.Perrier
- Psorospermum orientale (Engl.) Byng & Christenh.
- Psorospermum parviflorum Engl.
- Psorospermum periclitatum Byng & Christenh.
- Psorospermum revolutum (Choisy) Drake
- Psorospermum rienanense H.Perrier
- Psorospermum rubrifolium H.Perrier
- Psorospermum sambiranense H.Perrier
- Psorospermum senegalense Spach
- Psorospermum sexlineatum H.Perrier
- Psorospermum staudtii Engl.
- Psorospermum stenophyllum H.Perrier
- Psorospermum suffruticosum Engl.
- Psorospermum tenuifolium Hook.f.
- Psorospermum torrei (Mendes) Byng & Christenh.
- Psorospermum trichophyllum Baker
- Psorospermum versicolor H.Perrier
