= Psorospermum torrei =

Scientific classification
- Kingdom: Plantae
- Clade: Tracheophytes
- Clade: Angiosperms
- Clade: Eudicots
- Clade: Rosids
- Order: Malpighiales
- Family: Hypericaceae
- Genus: Psorospermum
- Species: P. torrei

Binomial name
- Psorospermum torrei (Mendes) Byng & Christenh.

Synonyms
- Vismia torrei Mendes

Species of flowering plant

Psorospermum torrei is a species of flowering plant in the family Hypericaceae. It is endemic to Mozambique.

The species was first described as Vismia torrei by Eduardo José Santos Moreira Mendes in 1969. In 2018 James W. Byng and Maarten Christenhusz placed it in genus Psorospermum as P. torrei.
