= Psorospermum periclitatum =

Conservation status
- Endangered (IUCN 3.1)

Scientific classification
- Kingdom: Plantae
- Clade: Tracheophytes
- Clade: Angiosperms
- Clade: Eudicots
- Clade: Rosids
- Order: Malpighiales
- Family: Hypericaceae
- Genus: Psorospermum
- Species: P. periclitatum

Binomial name
- Psorospermum periclitatum Byng & Christenh.

Synonyms
- Vismia pauciflora Milne-Redh.

Species of flowering plant

Psorospermum periclitatum is a species of flowering plant in the Hypericaceae family. It is a tree native to Lindi and Mtwara regions of southeastern Tanzania, including Selous Game Reserve and the Rondo Plateau. It grows in woodland at forest edges from 230 to 880 metres elevation. It is threatened by habitat loss.
