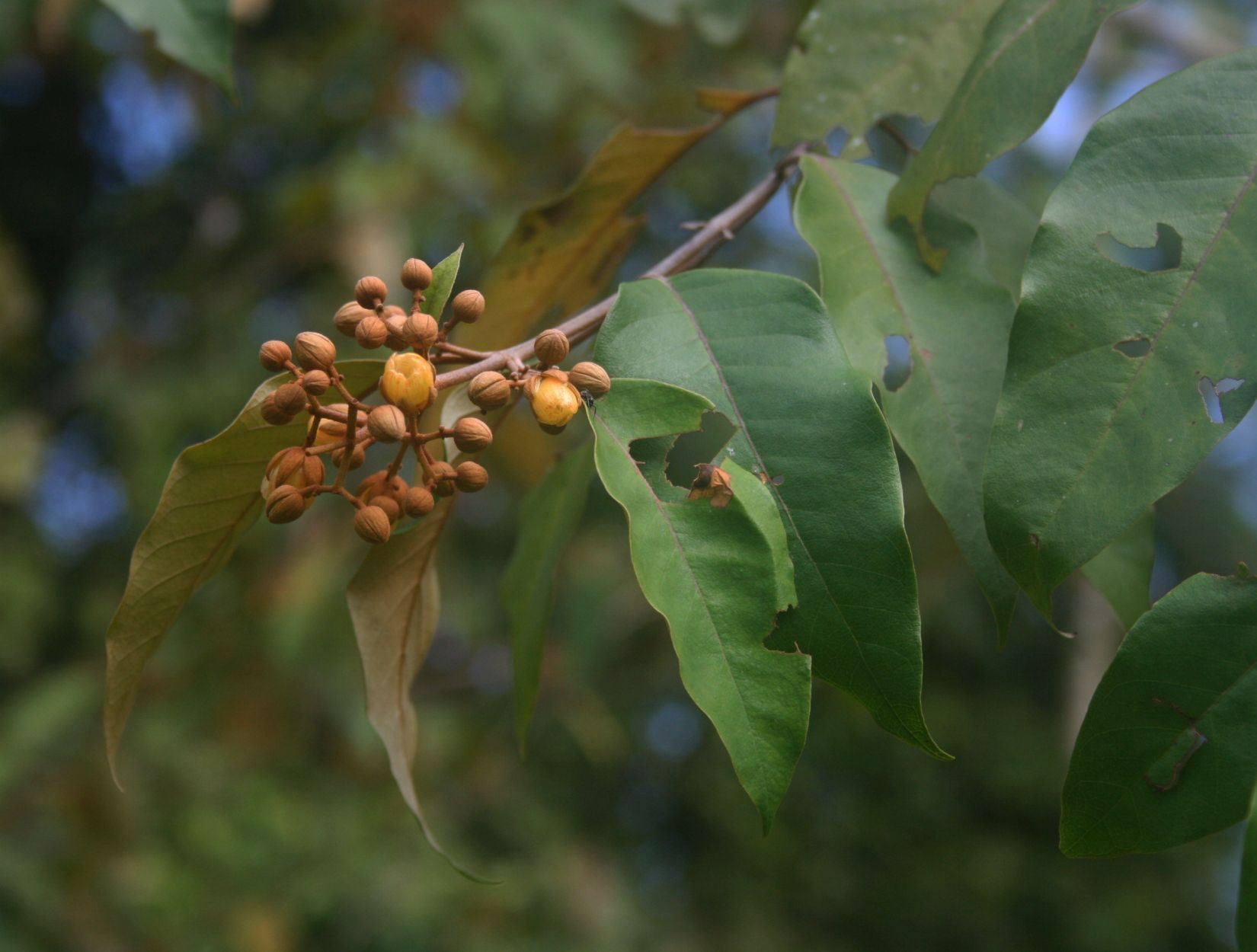

Conservation status
- Least Concern (IUCN 3.1)

Scientific classification
- Kingdom: Plantae
- Clade: Tracheophytes
- Clade: Angiosperms
- Clade: Eudicots
- Clade: Rosids
- Order: Malpighiales
- Family: Hypericaceae
- Genus: Vismia
- Species: V. baccifera

Binomial name
- Vismia baccifera (L.) Triana & Planch.

Subspecies
- Vismia baccifera subsp. baccifera; Vismia baccifera subsp. dealbata (Kunth) Ewan

Synonyms
- Species: Hypericum bacciferum L.; Vismia guttifera Pers.; Caopia baccifera (L.) Kuntze; subsp. baccifera: Vismia mexicana Schltdl.; Vismia panamensis Duchass. & Walp.; Caopia mexicana (Schltdl.) Kuntze; Caopia panamensis (Duchass. & Walp.) Kuntze; subsp. dealbata: Hypericum petiolatum L.; Vismia petiolata (L.) Choisy; Vismia dealbata Kunth; Caopia dealbata (Kunth) Kuntze; Caopia petiolata (L.) Kuntze; Vismia hamanii S.F.Blake

= Vismia baccifera =

Species of flowering plant

Vismia baccifera is a species of flowering plant in the family Hypericaceae. The species is a shrub or small tree that is native to Latin America that is found in wet tropical areas.

== Description ==
Vismia baccifera has shorter and larger leaves than V. guianensis. It has ovate leaves which are membranous and covered in a whitish layer on the underside.

== Taxonomy ==
Vismia baccifera was first described by Carl Linnaeus as Hypericum bacciferum in 1771, but was moved into the genus Vismia by botanists José Jerónimo Triana and Jules Émile Planchon in 1863. There are two accepted subspecies of V. baccifera:

- Vismia baccifera subsp. baccifera (nominate subspecies)
- Vismia baccifera subsp. dealbata (Kunth) Ewan

== Chemistry and uses ==
The leaves of Vismia baccifera contain various flavonoids, including epicatechin and quercetin. The species' essential oil profile is characterized by high amounts of sesquiterpenes. Vismia baccifera subsp. dealbata has been shown to contain the compounds sesamin, friedelin and vismiaquinone. V. baccifera is used in traditional medicine in parts of the Amazon rainforest as treatment for inflammations like uterine hemorrhage and leishmaniasis. A 2018 study by scientists from the University of the Basque Country demonstrated the ability of the species to kill liver tumor cells in a laboratory setting using aqueous extracts from its leaves.
