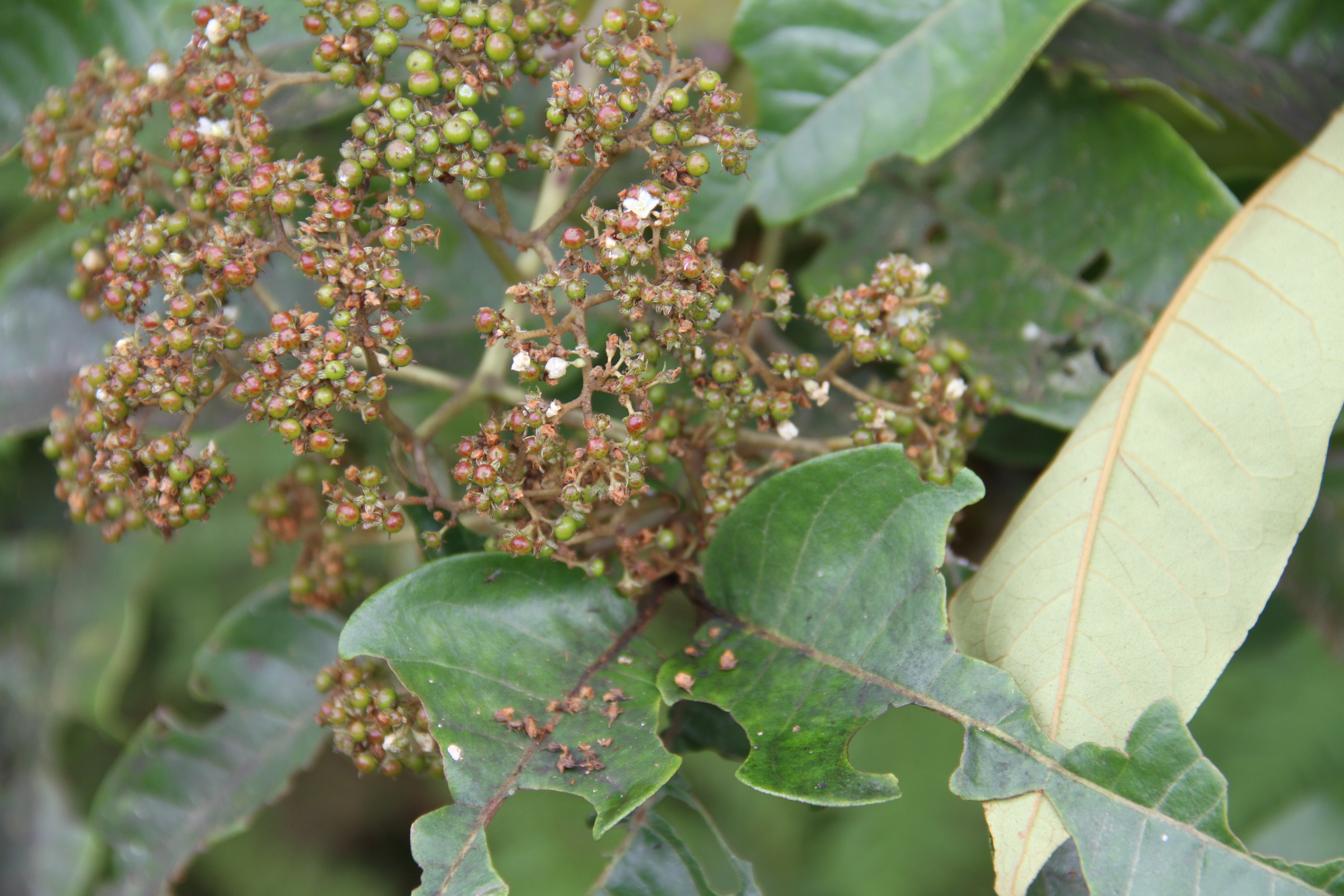
- Harungana madagascariensis

Conservation status
- Least Concern (IUCN 3.1)

Scientific classification
- Kingdom: Plantae
- Clade: Tracheophytes
- Clade: Angiosperms
- Clade: Eudicots
- Clade: Rosids
- Order: Malpighiales
- Family: Hypericaceae
- Genus: Harungana
- Species: H. madagascariensis

Binomial name
- Harungana madagascariensis Lam. ex Poir.

Synonyms
- Haronga ovata Thouars; Harungana paniculata Pers.; Harungana pubescens Poir.; Haronga madagascariensis (Lam. ex Poir.) Choisy; Haronga madagascariensis var. pubescens (Poir.) Choisy; Haemocarpus paniculatus (Pers.) Spreng.; Haronga paniculata (Pers.) Lodd. ex Steud.; Haronga pubescens (Poir.) Steud.; Psorospermum leonense Turcz.; Haronga paniculata var. oblongifolia (Engl.) De Wild.; Haronga paniculata f. oblongifolia Engl.; Harungana robynsii Spirlet

= Harungana madagascariensis =

Species of flowering plant

Harungana madagascariensis is a flowering plant found in Madagascar that is commonly known as the dragon's blood tree, orange-milk tree or haronga.

== Description ==
The haronga is a small, bushy tree that usually ranges from 4 m to 7 m in height, but sometimes it can grow up to 25 meters. The branches stem out from a cylindrical trunk. Its crown appears to be golden-green color. Bole is always angular and forked. Bark appears to be maroon-colored and it is vertically fissured. The scales are vertically arranged and can be flaked off easily. The tree can be immediately identified by its almost fluorescent orange latex from strips that were peeled off from the stem. The orange latex discharges when leaves are snapped off or branches are broken. Majority of tree surface is covered with stellate hairs. When damaged, the bark exudes orange latex.

Its leaves are opposite, simple and ovate. Leaf blades 6–20 by 3–10 cm. Leaves appear to be glossy. Leaf blade underside is covered with stellate hairs or scales. Prominent veining. Underside surface is covered with dense rusty hair. Numerous lateral nerves. Young leaves are distinctive due to it brown lower surface. Apex tapering. Petiole 1.5–3 cm long.

The flowers are small, approximately 5-6mm. Bisexual. White or cream colored. Almond scented. Sepals are marked by dark red-brownish dots. Stamens fused into five bundles, usually two or three stamens per bundle. But single stamen can also be found occasionally. Ovary is marked by dark glandular spots. Stalks and calyx are covered with short rusty hairs. In Southern Africa, flowering can be observed from January to April and fruiting season lasts until October. In Sierra Leone, the plant flowering begins in May and reaches its maximum in August and September, then tapers off around December.

The fruits are small about 3mm in diameter, +/-globular. Berry-like (drupe). Fruit appear to be greenish-orange and it becomes red when mature. Calyx persistent. Fruits are marked by glandular dots and streaks. Endocarp surface is hard which makes it difficult to cut. The fruit is not edible and have no apparent use.

Its cotyledons are broadly spathulate, margins marked with dark 'oil' glands, petioles relatively long and slender. At the tenth leaf stage: 'oil' glands appear to be very dark, visible in transmitted light and on the underside of the leaf blade. Seeds are susceptible to insect attack.

== Pharmacology ==
This plant has been used as a treatment for several diseases such as jaundice typhoid fever, anemia, along with some skin and heart problems. They correlate with different pharmacological tests involved with different plant extracts and can be identified as antioxidants and antitrichomonal.

== Bibliography ==
- Eggeling (1940). Indigenous Trees of Uganda. Govt. of Uganda.
- Hamilton, A. C. (1981). A Field Guide to Uganda Forest Trees.
- Happi, Gervais Mouthé; Tiani, Gesquiere Laure M.; Gbetnkom, Bel Youssouf M.; Hussain, Hidayat; Green, Ivan Robert; Ngadjui, Bonaventure Tchaleu; Kouam, Simeon Fogue (February 2020). "Phytochemistry and pharmacology of Harungana madagascariensis: mini review". Phytochemistry Letters. 35: 103–112. Bibcode:2020PChL...35..103H. doi:10.1016/j.phytol.2019.11.015.
- Katende, A. B.; Birnie, Ann; Tengnäs, Bo (1995). Useful Trees and Shrubs for Uganda: Identification, Propagation, and Management for Agricultural and Pastoral Communities. Regional Soil Conservation Unit. ISBN 978-9966-896-22-3.
- Identification, Propagation and Management for Agricultural and Pastoral Communities. Regional Soil Conservation Unit (RSCU), Swedish International Development Authority (SIDA).
- Kokwaro, J. O. (1976). Medicinal Plants of East Africa. East African Literature Bureau.
- Keay, R. W. (1989). Trees of Nigeria. Clarendon Press Oxford.
- Savill, P. S; Fox, J. E. D. (1967). Trees of Sierra Leone.
- Williams, R. O. (1949). The useful and ornamental plants in Zanzibar and Pemba. Zanzibar Protectorate. OCLC 686133425.
