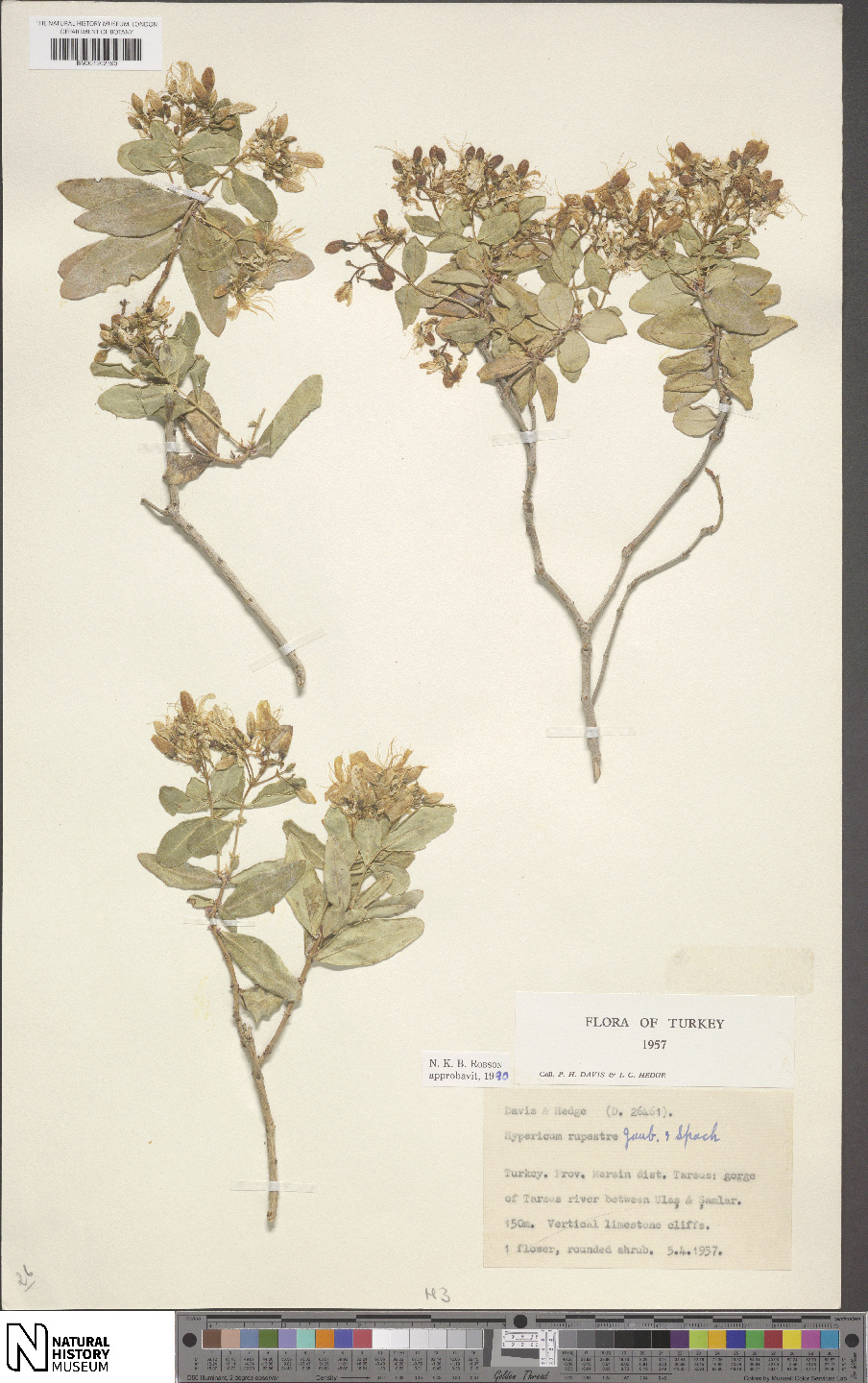
- Hypericum rupestre, the type species of the section

Scientific classification
- Kingdom: Plantae
- Clade: Tracheophytes
- Clade: Angiosperms
- Clade: Eudicots
- Clade: Rosids
- Order: Malpighiales
- Family: Hypericaceae
- Genus: Hypericum
- Section: Hypericum sect. Arthrophyllum; Jaub. & Spach

Type species
- Hypericum rupestre Jaub. & Spach

Species
- H. cardiophyllum Boiss.; Hypericum nanum Poir.; Hypericum pamphylicum N. Robson & P.H.Davis; Hypericum rupestre Jaub. & Spach; Hypericum vacciniifolium Hayek & Siehe

= Hypericum sect. Arthrophyllum =

Group of flowering plants

Arthrophyllum is one of 36 sections in the genus Hypericum. It contains 5 species and its type species is H. rupestre.
