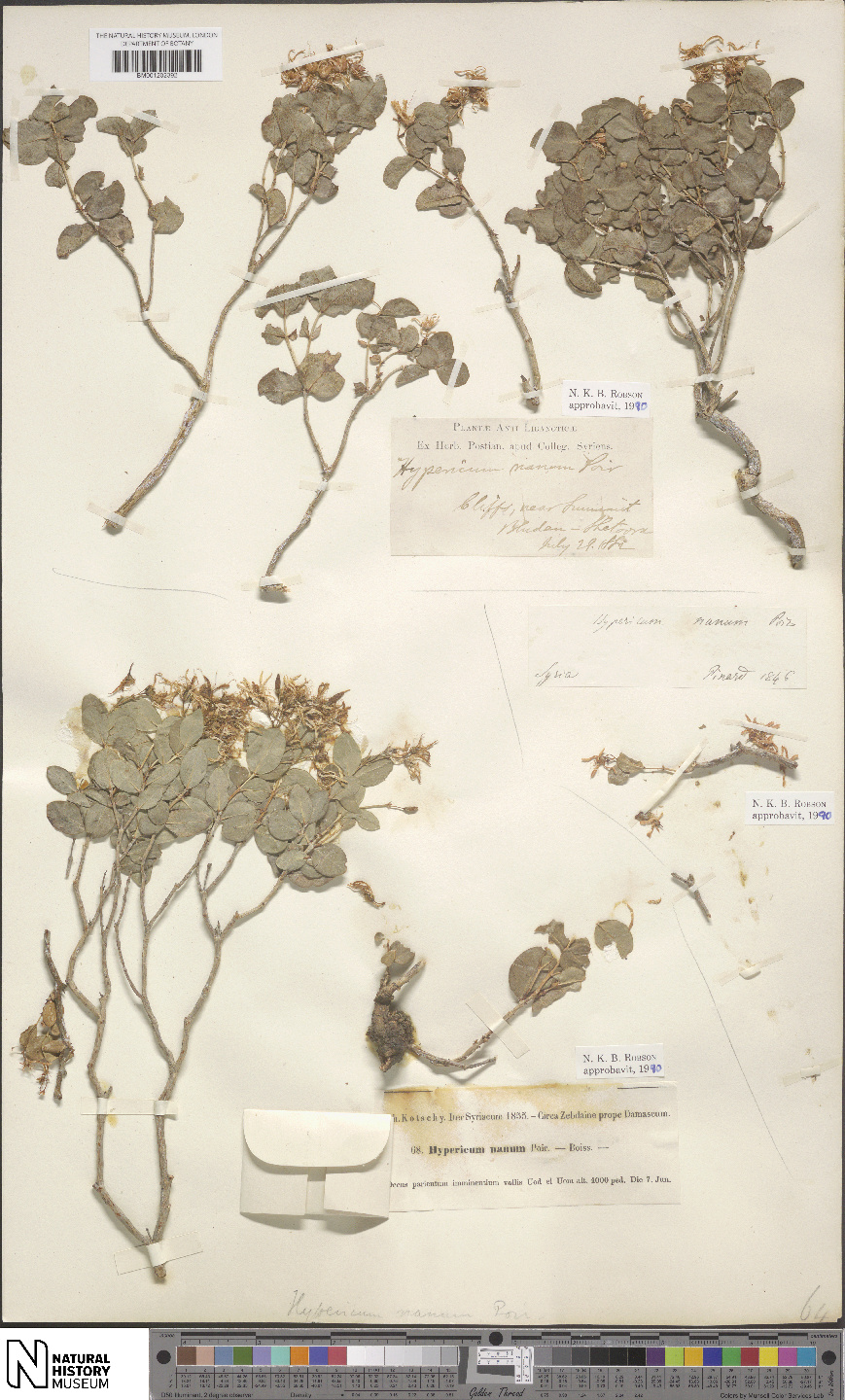

Scientific classification
- Kingdom: Plantae
- Clade: Tracheophytes
- Clade: Angiosperms
- Clade: Eudicots
- Clade: Rosids
- Order: Malpighiales
- Family: Hypericaceae
- Genus: Hypericum
- Section: Hypericum sect. Arthrophyllum
- Species: H. nanum

Binomial name
- Hypericum nanum Poir.

Varieties
- Hypericum nanum var. nanum; Hypericum nanum var. prostratum Boiss.

= Hypericum nanum =

Species of flowering plant in the St John's wort family

Hypericum nanum is a species of flowering plant in the family Hypericaceae which is native to Lebanon, Syria, and Israel.
