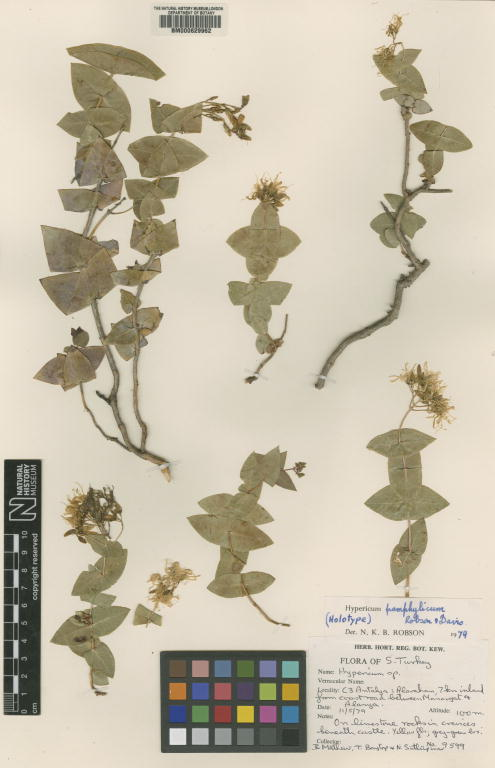

Scientific classification
- Kingdom: Plantae
- Clade: Tracheophytes
- Clade: Angiosperms
- Clade: Eudicots
- Clade: Rosids
- Order: Malpighiales
- Family: Hypericaceae
- Genus: Hypericum
- Section: Hypericum sect. Arthrophyllum
- Species: H. pamphylicum

Binomial name
- Hypericum pamphylicum N.Robson & P.H.Davis

= Hypericum pamphylicum =

Species of flowering plant in the St John's wort family

Hypericum pamphylicum is a species of flowering plant in the family Hypericaceae which is endemic to Turkey.
