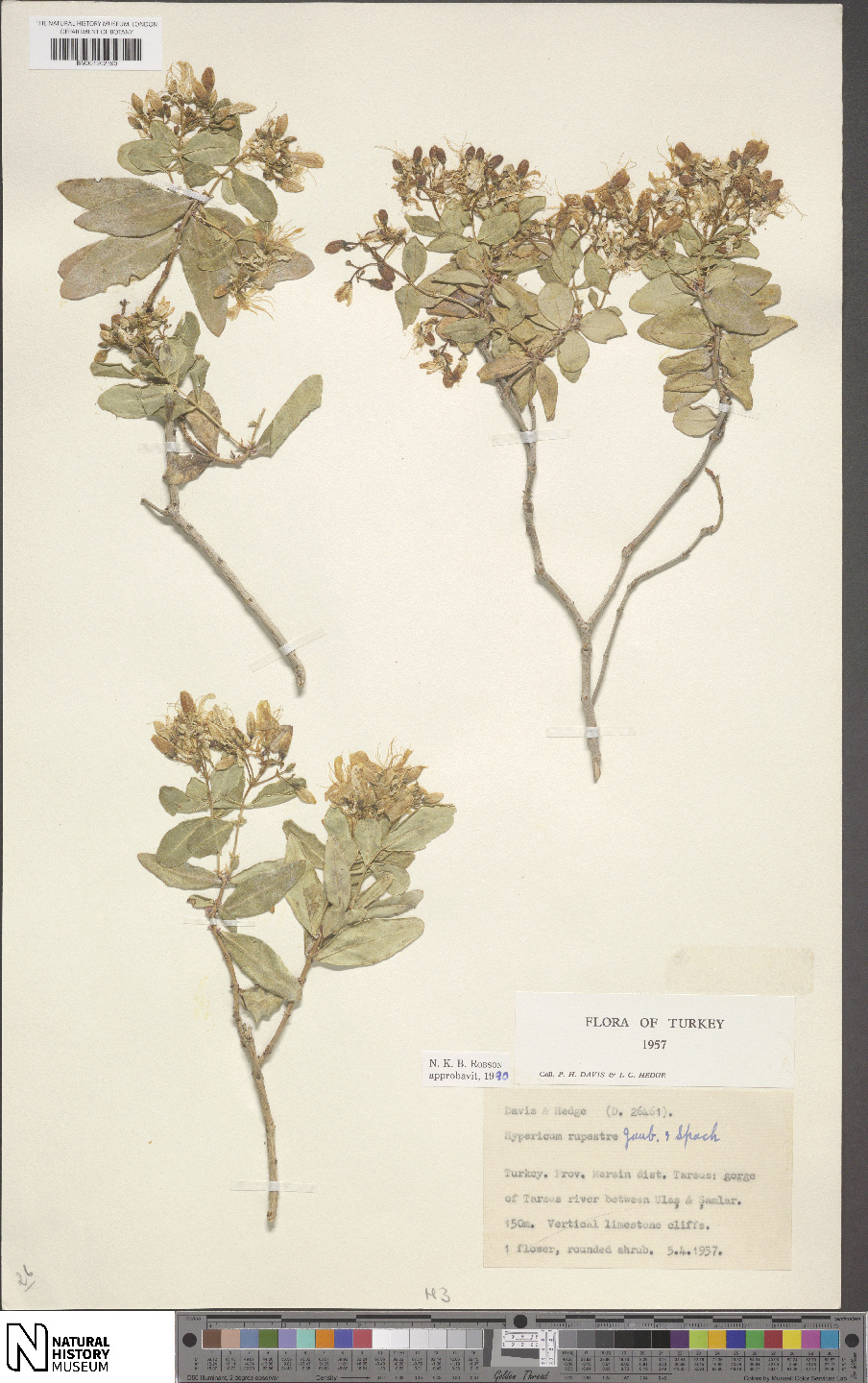
- Specimen of Hypericum rupestre

Scientific classification
- Kingdom: Plantae
- Clade: Tracheophytes
- Clade: Angiosperms
- Clade: Eudicots
- Clade: Rosids
- Order: Malpighiales
- Family: Hypericaceae
- Genus: Hypericum
- Section: Hypericum sect. Arthrophyllum
- Species: H. rupestre

Binomial name
- Hypericum rupestre Jaub. & Spach (1842)

Synonyms
- H. rupestre α rotundifolium Jaub. & Spach; H. rupestre β ovalifolium Jaub. & Spach

= Hypericum rupestre =

Species of flowering plant

Hypericum rupestre is a species of flowering plant in the genus Hypericum. It is the type species of sect. Arthrophyllum. It was first described by Hippolyte Jaubert and Édouard Spach in 1842 in the journal Ill. Pl. Orient.. The species is found only in a small area in the southern region of Turkey.

== Description ==
The species is a shrub that grows up to 30 centimeters in height. It stands erect and is a bushy, rounded shape with erect or tortuous branches. The stems are 4-lined and are green when young, but later become red-brown and flattened, and still later turn grey. The species has 9-16 flowers that usually grow from two nodes. The flowers are 2-2.5 centimeters in diameter with elliptic and rounded buds, and their petals are bright yellow. It has 30-40 stamens, 3 ovaries, and 3-4 times as many styles as ovaries.

== Uses ==
H. rupestre, alongside several other species, is used as a traditional folk medicine in its native country, Turkey. Because of this, it has been investigated for its antibacterial properties, and ethanols extracted from it have been shown to be effective antimicrobials against Staphylococcus aureus and Bordatella bronchiseptica.

Antibacterial activity of ethanol extracts
Plant Tested	Aqueous extract		Ethanol extract	
Plant Tested	MIC	MBC	MIC	MBC
Hypericum rupestre	1.6–6.3 mg/mL	3.2–25 mg/mL	0.8–3.2 mg/mL	1.6–12.5 mg/mL
