= Honeysuckle bush =

Honeysuckle bush may refer to:

- A number of species of Lonicera, the honeysuckles, of shrubby habit
- North American azaleas such as the piedmont azaleas (Rhododendron canescens and Rhododendron flammeum) and others (e.g. Rhododendron prunifolium)
- Rhododendron luteum, the yellow azalea or honeysuckle azalea, native to southeastern Europe and western Asia
- Diervilla, three species of shrub also known as bush honeysuckles, native to eastern North America

== See also ==
- Bush honeysuckle
- Honeysuckle (disambiguation)
