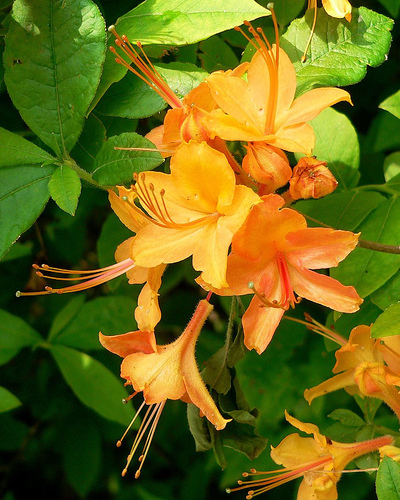
- Rhododendron calendulaceum at Craggy Gardens, North Carolina

Scientific classification
- Kingdom: Plantae
- (unranked): Angiosperms
- (unranked): Eudicots
- (unranked): Asterids
- Order: Ericales
- Family: Ericaceae
- Genus: Rhododendron
- Subgenus: Hymenanthes
- Section: Pentanthera
- Subsection: Pentanthera

Species
- See text

= North American azaleas =

Pentanthera

Subsection of plants

North American azaleas are flowering shrubs in the genus Rhododendron, subgenus Hymenanthes, section Pentanthera, subsection Pentanthera, so named because they all have five stamens. Most are in the United States, with one species found in Canada and one being found in Mexico. North American azaleas are commonly confused with azaleas of Asian origin, the evergreen azaleas. North American azaleas are deciduous and produce two types of buds. One is a larger and produces about 20 flowers while the other bud produces a leafy shoot. The flower color, fragrance, and number of stamens vary among species.

== Rhododendron alabamense ==
Rhododendron alabamense is found most commonly in Alabama. It can also be found in southern Tennessee, east Georgia, the panhandle of Florida, and eastern Mississippi. This is not a common species, despite its range. It can be found in moist places that are sandy and flat. It is also found in steep, dry areas, like bluffs. The flowers can smell musky or sweet, and lemony. The flowers are white, white with a yellow patch, or light pink. They are sticky due to glandular and non-glandular hairs on the floral tubes. The leaves are dull to slightly glossy, and dark to medium green. The flowers are produced from April into early June.

== Rhododendron arborescens ==
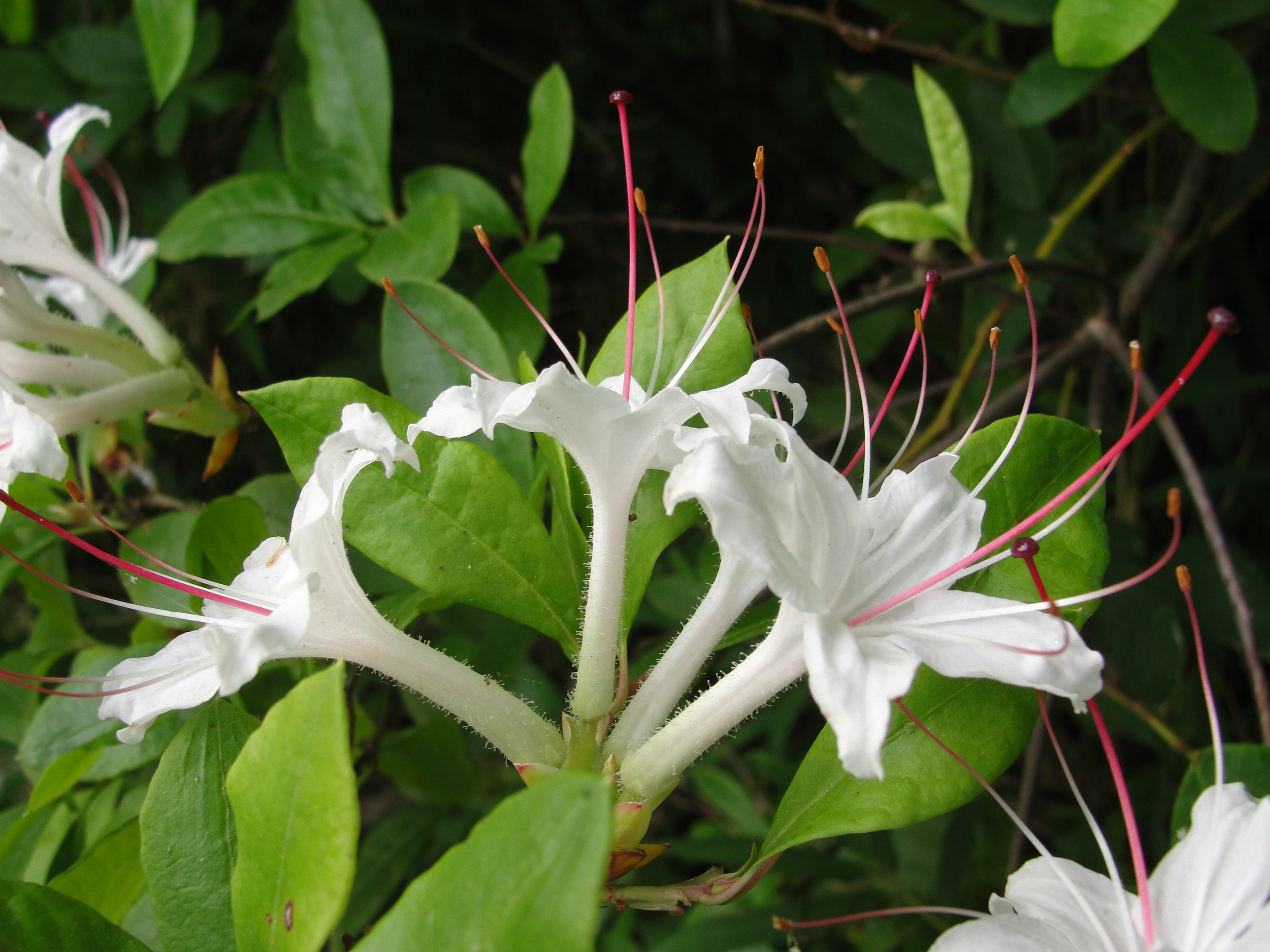
Rhododendron aborescens

Rhododendron arborescens is also called the sweet azalea. It grows from Alabama to Pennsylvania, along the top of wet mountains and near fast moving streams. The flowers can be up to 2 inches wide, white, and commonly have a yellow patch on them. It would be rare to see a light pink color or light yellow. The pistil and the filaments are normally red. This characteristic makes it easy to identify the species. The flowers have white tubes. This azalea is sometimes also called the smooth azalea for its new leaf growth has no hair, making it smooth to the touch. The leaves range from a blue-green, dark green, or a medium green, and the underside is a light white color. The leaves are usually glossy. Its seeds are granular. Plants blooms from May to August.

== Rhododendron atlanticum ==
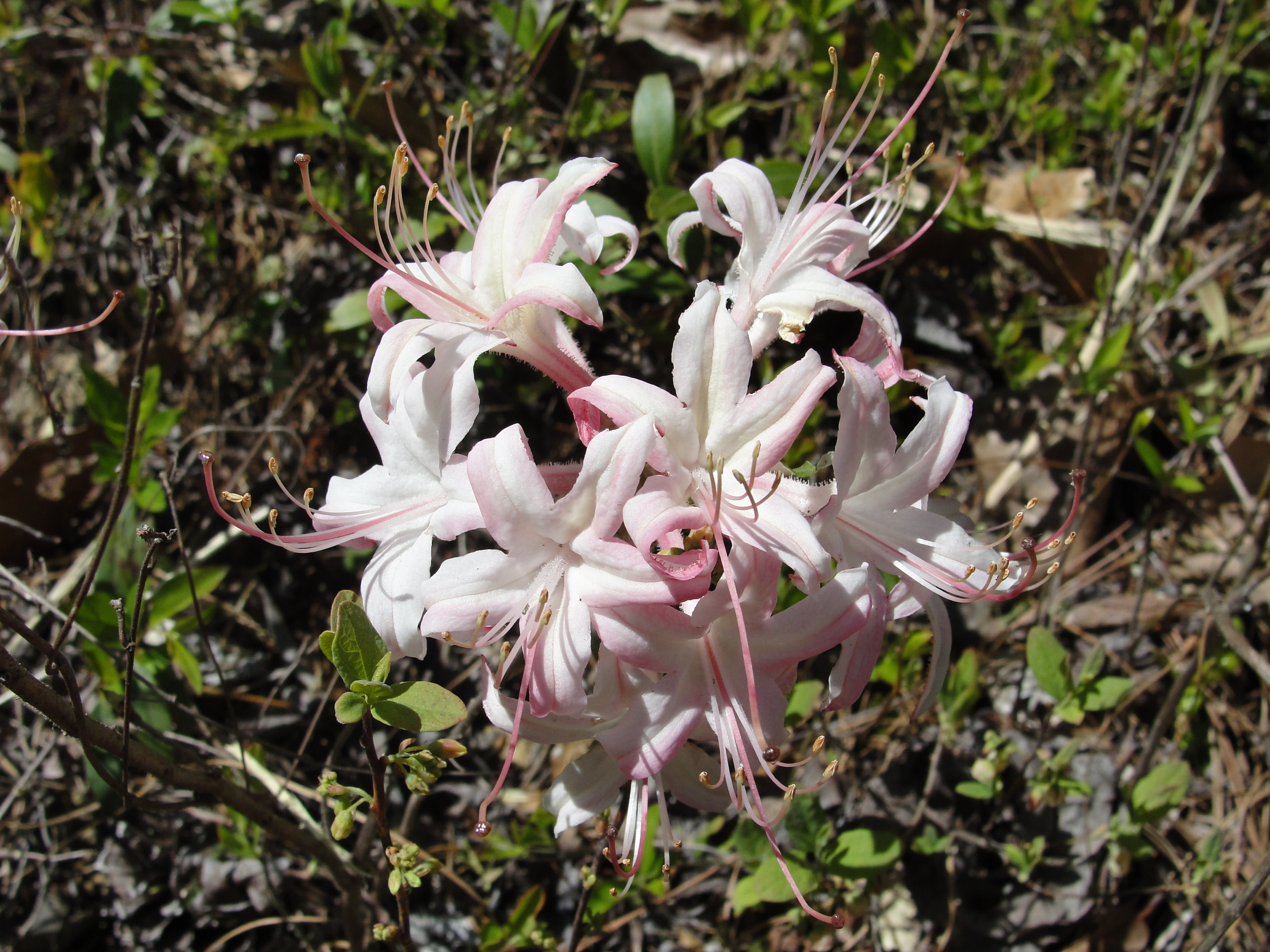
Rhododendron atlanticum

Rhododendron atlanticum, the dwarf azalea, grows on the coastal plain from Georgia to Delaware. It can be found up to 200 miles away from the coast, if the region is sandy, swampy, or dry. These plants can spread by rhizomes if the soil is loose. The flowers can be white or a light pink color, and are fragrant. The flower tubes are the same colors, and are glandular. The pinkish red glands form a line onto each petal tip. Leaf color ranges from gray-green to blue-green. Dwarf azaleas are commonly less than two feet tall. They bloom in the months April and May.

== Rhododendron austrinum ==
Rhododendron austrinum is also called the Florida azalea. It is closely related to R. canescens, and it can be difficult to tell the two apart. It is found in the panhandle of Florida, and the southern regions of Georgia, Alabama, and Mississippi. It has become a popular species in North America because it is easy to grow, is very colorful, and also early to bloom. The flowers range between yellow, orange, and gold. The tubes are a pink/red. The pink color may be a hybrid between this azalea and R. canescens. The stems, leaves, and tubes are glandular. They can grow up to 15 feet and grow well in the sand, and heat. They bloom from March to April.

== Rhododendron calendulaceum ==
Rhododendron calendulaceum is commonly called the flame azalea for its bright yellow, orange, or red color. It is considered to be a very attractive species that people associate with the Appalachian Mountains. It grows from 800 to 6,000 feet elevation ranging from the Piedmont to the Mountains. It can grow up to 12 feet in length. The flowers are 2-3 inches in width. The flower tubes are glandular. This azalea blooms from April to July.

== Rhododendron canescens ==
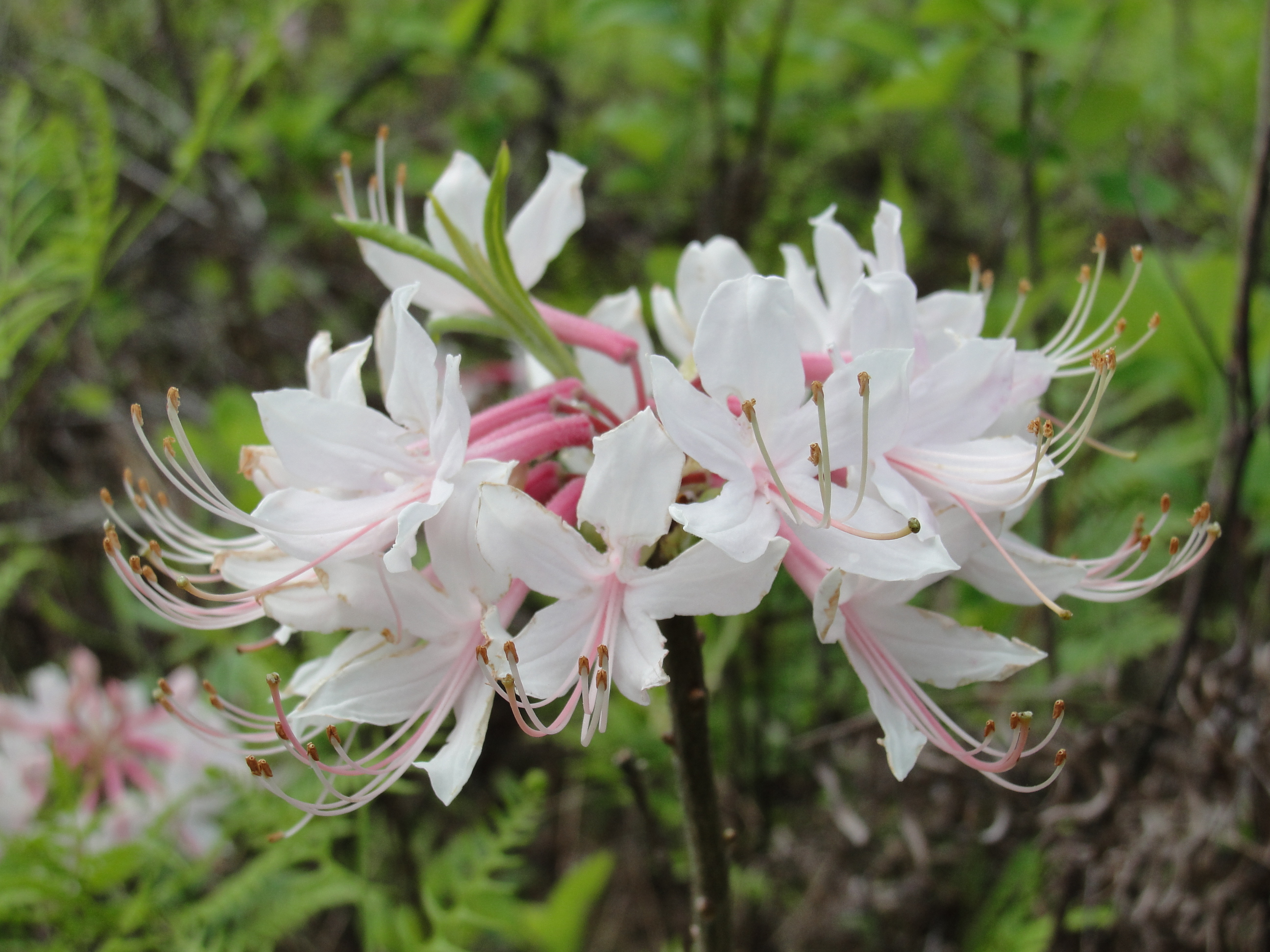
R. canescens

Rhododendron canescens also has the common names Piedmont Azalea, Southern Pinxter Azalea, and Wild Azalea. It grows in areas where swamps, pocosins, and savannas are present. R. canescens grows in northeast North Carolina, north Tennessee, southeastern Kentucky, southern Illinois, eastern Oklahoma, southern Arkansas, the peninsula of Florida, and southeast Texas. It blooms early March to May.

== Rhododendron colemanii ==
Rhododendron colemanii is commonly called the Red Hills azalea. It grows in moist areas like near streams, hammocks, and bluffs. It starts to bloom early to mid-May. It grows in Alabama and western Georgia along the upper Coastal Plain.

== Rhododendron cumberlandense ==
Rhododendron cumberlandense, or Cumberland azalea grows most commonly in the Cumberland Mountains west of the blue ridge. ^{[1]} It is commonly called the Cumberland azalea. This species can be confused with R. calendulaceum and R. flammeum due to the color of the flowers. They grow at higher elevations, and grow up to 10 feet, despite normally growing low to the ground and twiggy. The leaves are glossy, with a dull underside, and emerge later in the season. They bloom from May to July.

== Rhododendron eastmanii ==
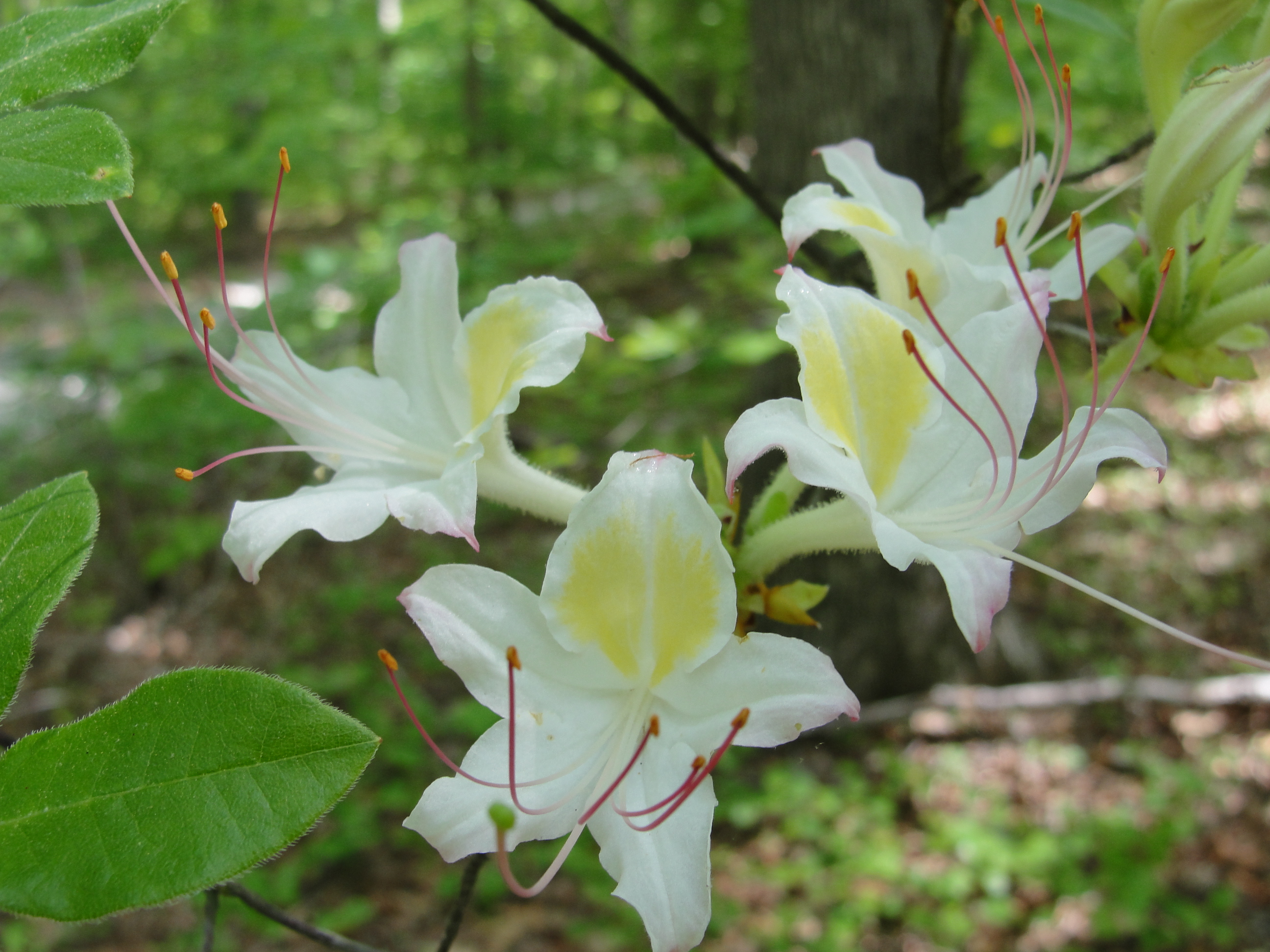
R. eastmanii

Rhododendron eastmanii is commonly called the May-white azalea. It is found only in South Carolina. It is a newer species, being named by Kron and Creel in 1999. There are 60 documented locations of this azalea in the wild. It is commonly found on steep slopes, usually facing northeast. They were also commonly found near streams. The pH of the soil they grow in varied from 4.6 to 6.8. The soil was composed of 65% to 90% sand, depending on location. This species flowers in May and has white petals, normally with a yellow blotch.

== Rhododendron flammeum ==
Rhododendron flammeum, also known as the Oconee azalea after the river in Georgia where was first discovered. With a species name of flammeum, it can be confused with the flame azalea (Rhododendron calendulaceum). Growing in the form of a shrub in dry woods, on slopes, ridges and stream bluffs, the Oconee blooms in the spring.

== Rhododendron occidentale ==
Rhododendron occidentale flowers in spring and summer, with a wide range of flower colors. It grows in moist areas near streams, wooded areas, bogs, bottoms of canyons, thickets, and ocean bluffs. Flower color ranges between white, pink, and salmon. The color blotches on the petal range from yellow to orange most commonly.

== Rhododendron periclymenoides ==
Rhododendron periclymenoides was formerly known as Rhododendron nudiflorum and is commonly known as the pinxter flower, pinxterbloom azalea or pink azalea. Growing in the form of a shrub, the flowers range in color from white to pink, with no blotches of color on the upper petal. This azalea blooms in the spring in moist wooded areas along streams, thickets, and swamps.

== Rhododendron prinophyllum ==
Rhododendron prinophyllum is a shrub, that has deciduous and hairy leaves. The pink flowers it produces is not likely to have any splotches of color on the upper petal. R. prinophyllum grows in swampy, wet areas like bogs, thickets, streams but can be in dry areas like rocky woods and bluffs, blooming in the spring.

== Rhododendron prunifolium ==
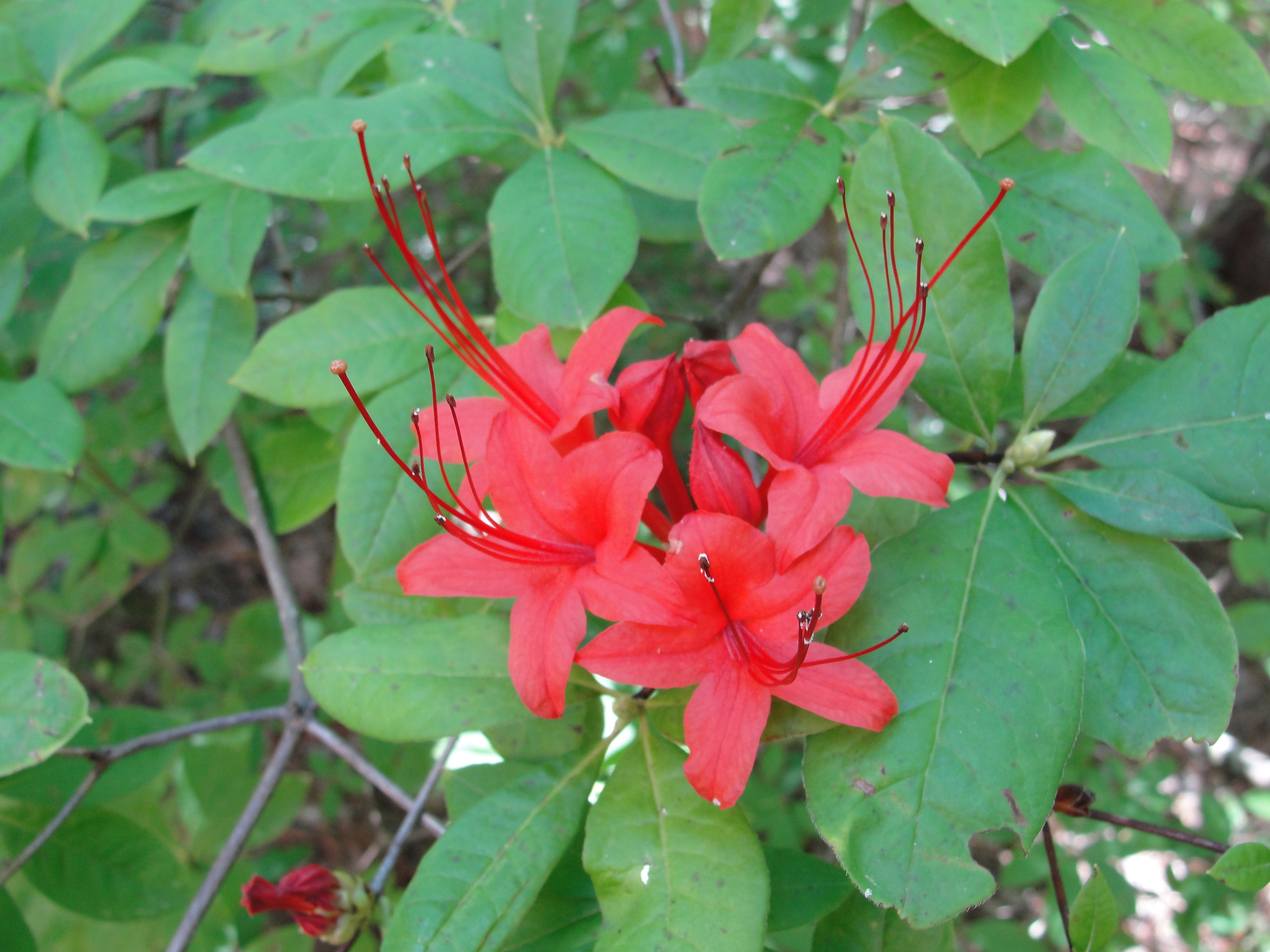
R. prunifolium

Rhododendron prunifolium is also called the plumleaf azalea. The flower color ranges from orange to red. It has smooth, large leaves that grow early in the season. The stem is also smooth, along with the flower tubes. A bush of the plumleaf azalea can grow up to more than 20 feet. This plant only grows in eleven counties on the border of Alabama and Georgia where creeks and ravines are present, blooming from July to September. Sometimes this species has pink flowers, which could be a hybrid with the sweet azalea.

== Rhododendron viscosum ==
Rhododendron viscosum is also known as the swamp azalea, catch-fly azalea (due to sticky and glandular hairs), and clammy azalea. Its large land area includes growth on the coastal area of Mississippi, and along the east coast from Florida to Maine. In addition to the coastal areas, the swamp azalea can be found inland in higher elevations. It can also be found in Oklahoma, Texas, and Louisiana. As swamp azalea implies, it prefers damp areas. Leaf shape and color vary greatly; from a bland grey-green, to a blue green, and from small and narrow and small to round and large. The texture of the leaf can be smooth, or rough. It is sometimes confused with R. aborescens, but can be distinguished upon comparison of leaf textures. The stem of R. aborescens is smooth, and R. viscosum has a hairy stem that is slimmer. The flowers are usually white and fragrant. This azalea is in bloom from May to September.

== Other species ==
Rhododendron luteum is in the subgenus Pentanthera, but it is not a North American species. It grows in Europe.
