= Bush honeysuckle =

Bush honeysuckle is a common name for several plants and may refer to:

- Diervilla, native to eastern North America
- Lonicera, several species of which have been introduced to and become invasive in various temperate regions:
  - Lonicera maackii, native to northeastern Asia and invasive in the United States and New Zealand
  - Lonicera morrowii, native to eastern Asia and invasive in the United States
  - Lonicera tatarica, native to Asia and invasive in the United States

== See also ==
- Honeysuckle bush
- Honeysuckle (disambiguation)
