= Dwarf azalea =

Dwarf azalea is a common name for several species of Rhododendron:

- Rhododendron atlanticum, native to the eastern United States
- Rhododendron kiusianum, native to Japan
- Rhododendron minus, the Piedmont Rhododendron
- Rhododendron nakaharai, native to Taiwan
