= Honeysucker =

Honeysucker may refer to:

== Animal common names ==
- Gyrinocheilus aymonieri, a freshwater fish
- Honeyeater (family Meliphagidae), small to medium-sized birds
- Sunbird (family Nectariniidae), passerine birds
  - Purple sunbird, or purple honeysucker
- Rufous hummingbird (Selasphorus rufus), described by Thomas Pennant in 1785 as ruffed honeysucker

== Other uses ==
- Vacuum truck
- Robert Honeysucker (1943–2017), American baritone

== See also ==
- Honeysuckle (disambiguation)
- Honeyguide (family Indicatoridae), a family of birds known as indicator birds or honey birds
