= Piedmont azalea =

Piedmont azalea is a common name for several plants and may refer to:

- Rhododendron canescens, with pink to white flowers
- Rhododendron flammeum, with red to orange flowers
