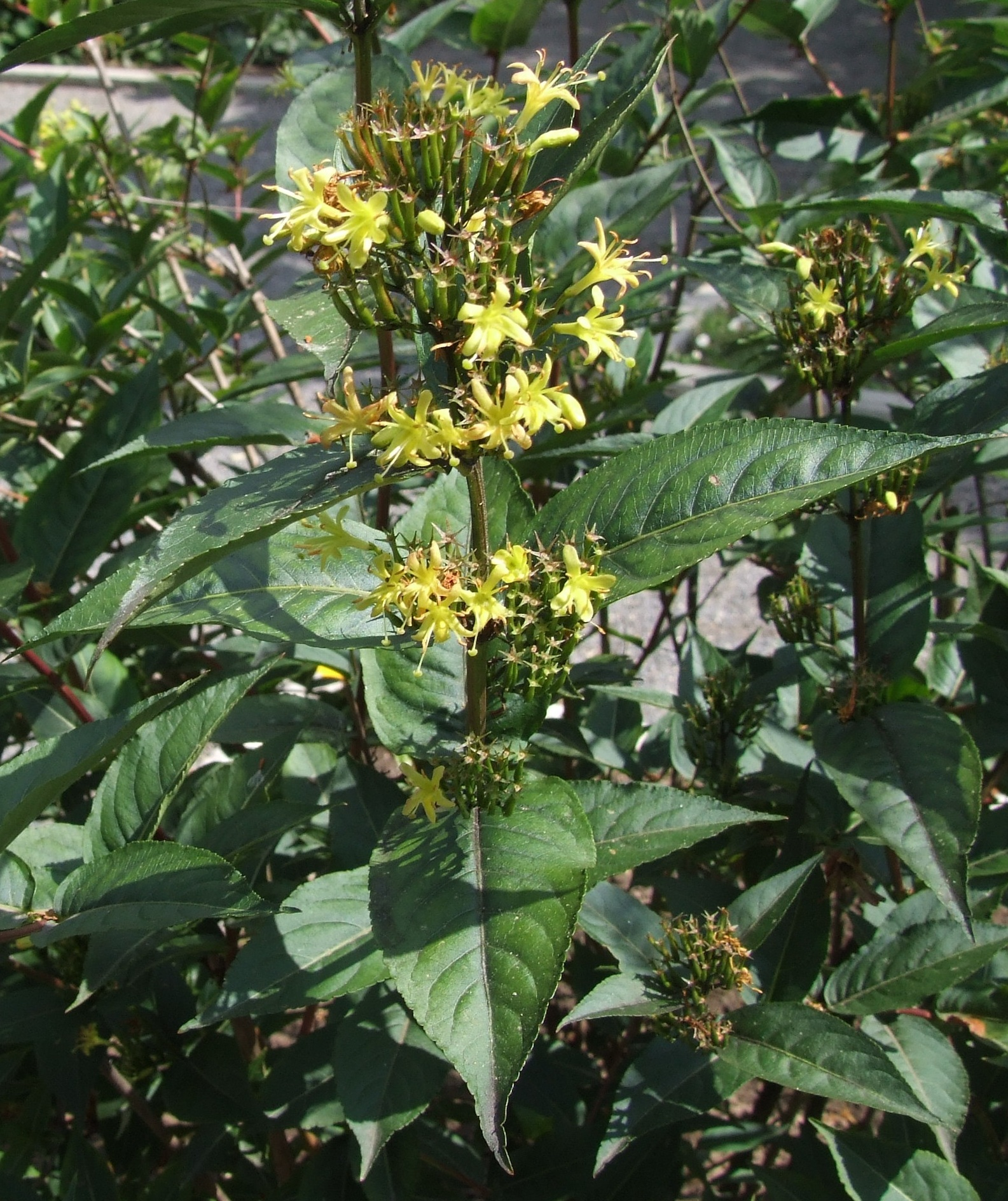

Conservation status
- Vulnerable (NatureServe)

Scientific classification
- Kingdom: Plantae
- Clade: Tracheophytes
- Clade: Angiosperms
- Clade: Eudicots
- Clade: Asterids
- Order: Dipsacales
- Family: Caprifoliaceae
- Genus: Diervilla
- Species: D. rivularis

Binomial name
- Diervilla rivularis Gattinger

= Diervilla rivularis =

Species of flowering plant

Diervilla rivularis is a species of flowering plant in the honeysuckle family known by common names mountain bush-honeysuckle and hairy bush-honeysuckle. It is native to the eastern United States, where it is limited to the southern Appalachian Mountains. It occurs in Alabama, Georgia and Tennessee. It is extirpated from North Carolina.

It is a compact, perennial shrub that grows 3–6 feet (0.91–1.83 m) tall. Flowers are trumpet-shaped, two-lipped, and pale yellow to greenish yellow. Leaves are simple, hairy and opposite, oval or elliptical. This plant grows in moist wooded areas and disturbed areas such as roadsides. It occurs at middle to higher elevations in its range. The Latin specific epithet rivularis means loving brooks. It refers to the plant's preference of growing in moist habitats.

The plant is considered "somewhat threatened" by habitat loss due to land-use conversion, habitat fragmentation, and forest management practices.

== Gallery ==
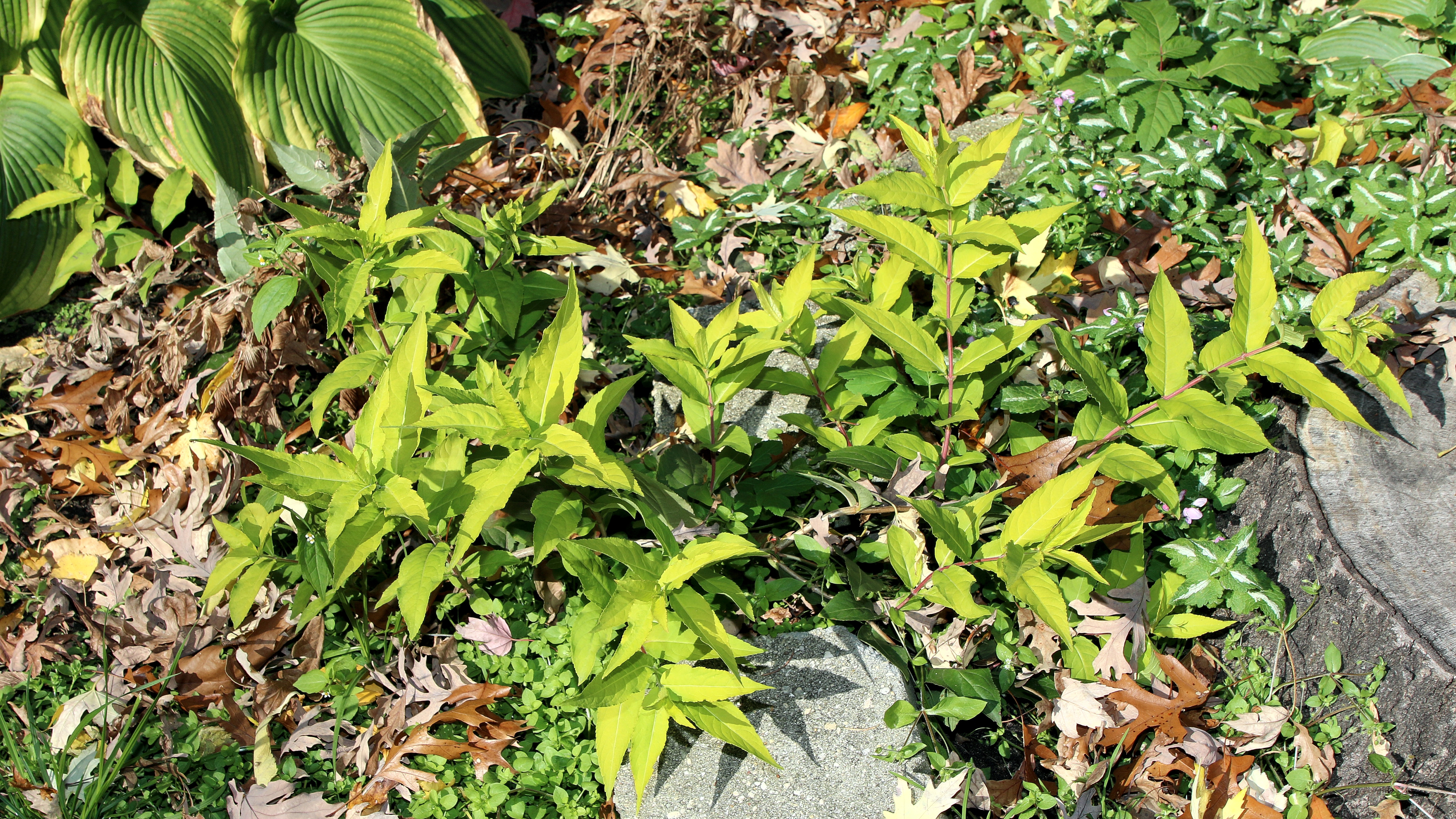
Diervilla rivularis 'Honeybee' a cultivar grown for its gold/yellow foliage.

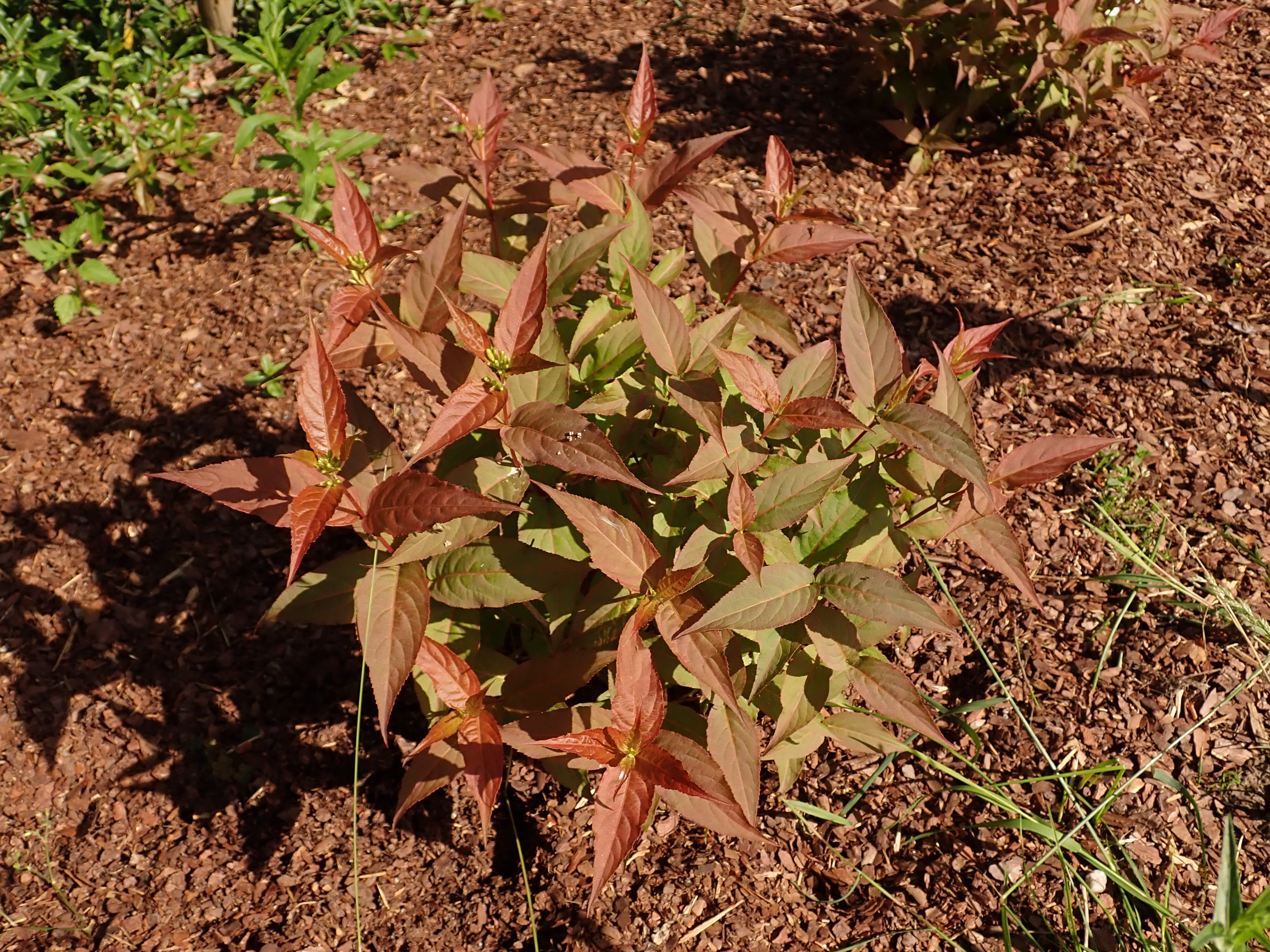
Diervilla rivularis 'Kodiak Black' grown for its bronze reddish foliage.
