= Boštanj, Sevnica =

Boštanj
- Location in Slovenia
- Coordinates: 46°0′49.58″N 15°16′52.54″E
- Country: Slovenia
- Traditional region: Lower Carniola
- Statistical region: Lower Sava
- Municipality: Sevnica

Area
  - Total: 1.32 km^{2} (0.51 sq mi)
- Elevation: 210 m (690 ft)

Population (2012)
  - Total: 305
  - Density: 231/km^{2} (600/sq mi)

Boštanj (pronounced [bɔˈʃtaːn] or [ˈboːʃtan]; in older sources also Gorenji Boštanj, German: Obersavenstein, Savenstein, Sowenstein, or Sawenstein) is a village in the Lower Sava Valley in southeastern Slovenia. It consists of a nucleated centre on two terraces on the right bank of the Sava River along the main road from Celje to Krško, and two hamlets, Puše and Redna, on the slopes of the nearby hills. It is the central settlement of the local community, the largest local community in the Municipality of Sevnica. The village has a post office, a fire station, a primary school, two shops, a gas station, two bars, a restaurant, and a cultural hall named the TVD Partizan Hall (Dom TVD Partizan). It is surrounded by fields and orchards.

== History ==
The oldest archaeological findings in the area of Boštanj are from the Hallstatt period (the 8th to 4th century BC), the older part of the Iron Age. Several burial mounds, excavated at the turn of the twentieth century, were created in the period from the end of the 8th century to the 5th century. They are a link between the cultural spaces of the Balkans and the Pannonia of the time.

The settlement was first mentioned in a document written on 31 October 1197 in Strasbourg. It mentions two noblemen from Boštanj, who were subjects of the Diocese of Krško. The second mention dates to 1228 and stats that there were ten farms in Boštanj at the time. Since 1322, Boštanj was property of the Lords of Žovnek and later of the Counts of Celje, who succeeded them.

In the 19th century and beginning of the 20th century, people in Boštanj were mostly farmers, some of them were craftsmen, such as millers, carpenters, roofers, and some were innkeepers. In 1850, a primary school was established in the village. In 1924, the town got its first electricity, produced by the Jakil Sawmill on the Mirna River. The entire village was electrified in 1934.

During World War II, Boštanj was occupied by the German forces. Starting in October 1941, they evicted most of the population and replaced them with Gottschee Germans. A police force station was established in the village. After December 1942, Boštanj became the seat of the main political municipality, composed of the political municipalities of Boštanj, Gabrje, and Impolje. In October 1943, the Slovene Partisans started an offensive in the area. They succeeded in taking the German post in Boštanj on 12 October, but had to retreat the following day. During these operations, several buildings in the village were burned; however the day was rainy and the village was mainly spared. Later that month, the Germans shot three Partisans. In 1949, a granite memorial was erected in the local cemetery in their memory.

A number of residential buildings were erected in Boštanj around 1960. In 1984, the side roads in Boštanj were paved with asphalt.

== Landmarks ==
=== Parish church ===
The first church in Boštanj was already standing in the 12th century, when the historical sources mention a parish branch in Boštanj, although they do not mention the church. It is probable that it was dedicated to the Holy Cross. The Parish of Boštanj was established in 1509. In that year, the construction of a new church building started in Boštanj and was completed in 1538. It was oriented in an east–west direction and surrounded by a cemetery. In the 19th century, to address the needs of a large parish, the parish priest Ignacij Kutnar ordered the construction of a larger building, which was finished in 1853.

The current church, dedicated to the Exaltation of the Holy Cross (Slovene: Povišanje svetega Križa), is a three-aisled hall with all aisles of the same height. It was mainly built in the neo-Romanesque style. It has four altars. The main altar of the new church was made in 1872. One of the side altars was the main altar in the former church and is dated to 1677, whereas the other three were made in the 19th century. The belfry has been preserved. In a chancel there is a memorial plaque to the Boštanj nobleman Wilhelm von Lamberg, which dates to 1574. The entire church was painted by Jože Cerinšek in 1933.

=== Stein Castle ===
Stein Castle (Slovene: Stajnski grad) next to the main road northwest of the village core was probably erected at the beginning of the 17th century. Today, only its Renaissance defence tower and its foundations are still visible. A Baroque chapel dedicated to St. Nicholas stands next to the castle. The castle and the chapel were burned in 1943, during World War II. A residential castle building and a stable are located on the other side of the tower and are referred to as "the Manor" today. Before the war, it had a number of owners; the last one was the industrialist Andrej Jakil after World War I. Now it houses a cement factory.

=== Na Gavgah ===
Na Gavgah (literally, 'at the gallows') is a forest northwest of the core of Boštanj. In the past, the local gallows were located there, which gave the forest its name. Na Gavgah is a habitat for Rhododendron luteum, which grows in only a few locations in Slovenia. In May 2006 information signs were installed at the site. The plant is also depicted in the coat of arms of the Local Community of Boštanj.

=== Power plant ===
A run-of-the-river hydroelectric power plant on the Sava was built in the settlement in 2006. It has an average yearly capacity of 115 GWh, corresponding to roughly 1% of current electricity production in Slovenia.
