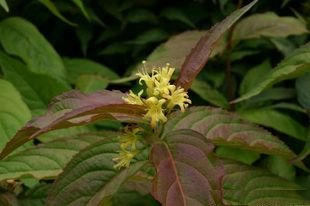

Conservation status
- Apparently Secure (NatureServe)

Scientific classification
- Kingdom: Plantae
- Clade: Tracheophytes
- Clade: Angiosperms
- Clade: Eudicots
- Clade: Asterids
- Order: Dipsacales
- Family: Caprifoliaceae
- Genus: Diervilla
- Species: D. sessilifolia

Binomial name
- Diervilla sessilifolia Buckley

= Diervilla sessilifolia =

Southern bush honeysuckle

Species of flowering plant

Diervilla sessilifolia, the southern bush honeysuckle, a member of the honeysuckle family Caprifoliaceae which blooms in summer, is a perennial shrub found in the Great Smoky Mountains and the southern Appalachian Mountains. Southern bush honeysuckle can be found growing on bluffs, along slopes and stream banks, and bordering woodlands. It is a threatened species in Tennessee.

This compact, deciduous shrub, typically growing three to five feet tall, spreads by suckering in zones 4 to 8. It is drought tolerant, grows in full sun as well as partial shade, and works best in a woodland garden.

D. sessilifolia has been marked as a pollinator plant, supporting and attracting bumblebees and hummingbirds.

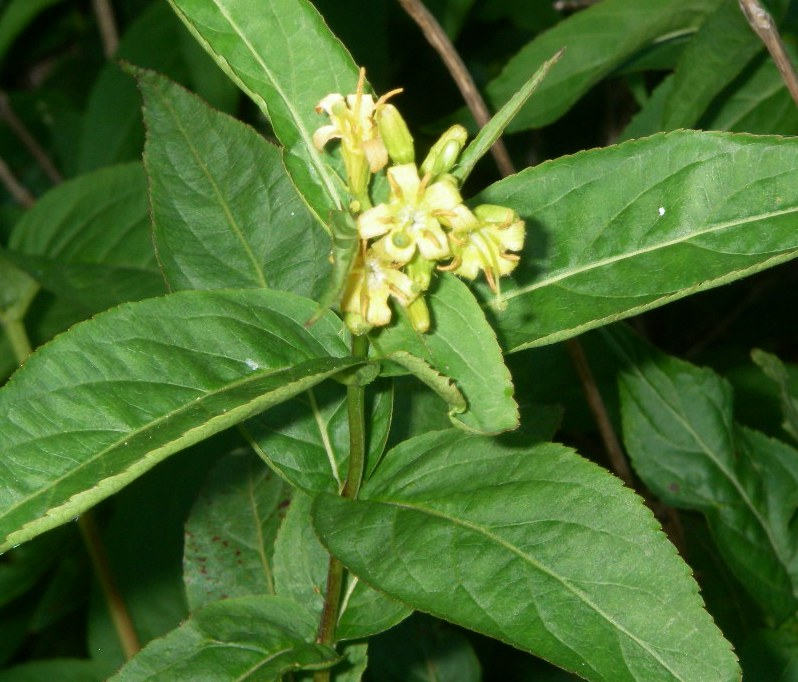
Closeup of bloom
