= Honeysuckle (disambiguation) =

Honeysuckles are arching shrubs or twining vines in the genus Lonicera

Honeysuckle may also refer to:

== Other plants with the common name ==
- Banksia aquilonia, northern banksia, or honeysuckle, from Australia
- Banksia integrifolia, coast banksia, or honeysuckle, from Australia
- Banksia marginata, silver banksia, or honeysuckle, from Australia
- Knightia excelsa, rewarewa, or New Zealand honeysuckle

== Other uses ==
- "Chevrefoil" ('Honeysuckle'), a Breton lai by Marie de France
- Honeysuckle Weeks, British actress
- Honeysuckle, Newcastle, an urban renewal project in Australia
- Honeysuckle (film), a 1938 Argentine film
- Honeysuckle (horse) (foaled 2014), Irish-trained racehorse

== See also ==
- Honeysuckle Rose (disambiguation)
- Honeysuckle Creek Tracking Station, Canberra, Australia
- "The Wild Honey Suckle", a 1786 poem by Philip Freneau
- Flame palmette, a motif in decorative art
- Grevillea striata, silvery honeysuckle, from Australia
- Helicia ferruginea, hairy honeysuckle, from Australia
- Lambertia multiflora, many-flowered honeysuckle, from Australia
- Lambertia rariflora, green honeysuckle, from Australia
- Banksia serrata, red honeysuckle, from Australia
- Anisacanthus, desert honeysuckles, from the Americas
- Diervilla, bush honeysuckles, from the Americas and Europe
- Justicia pilosella, false honeysuckle, from North America
- Oenothera simulans, morning honeysuckle, from North America
- Oenothera suffulta, honeysuckle gaura, from North America
- Leycesteria formosa, Himalayan honeysuckle
- Tecomaria capensis, Cape honeysuckle, from southern Africa
