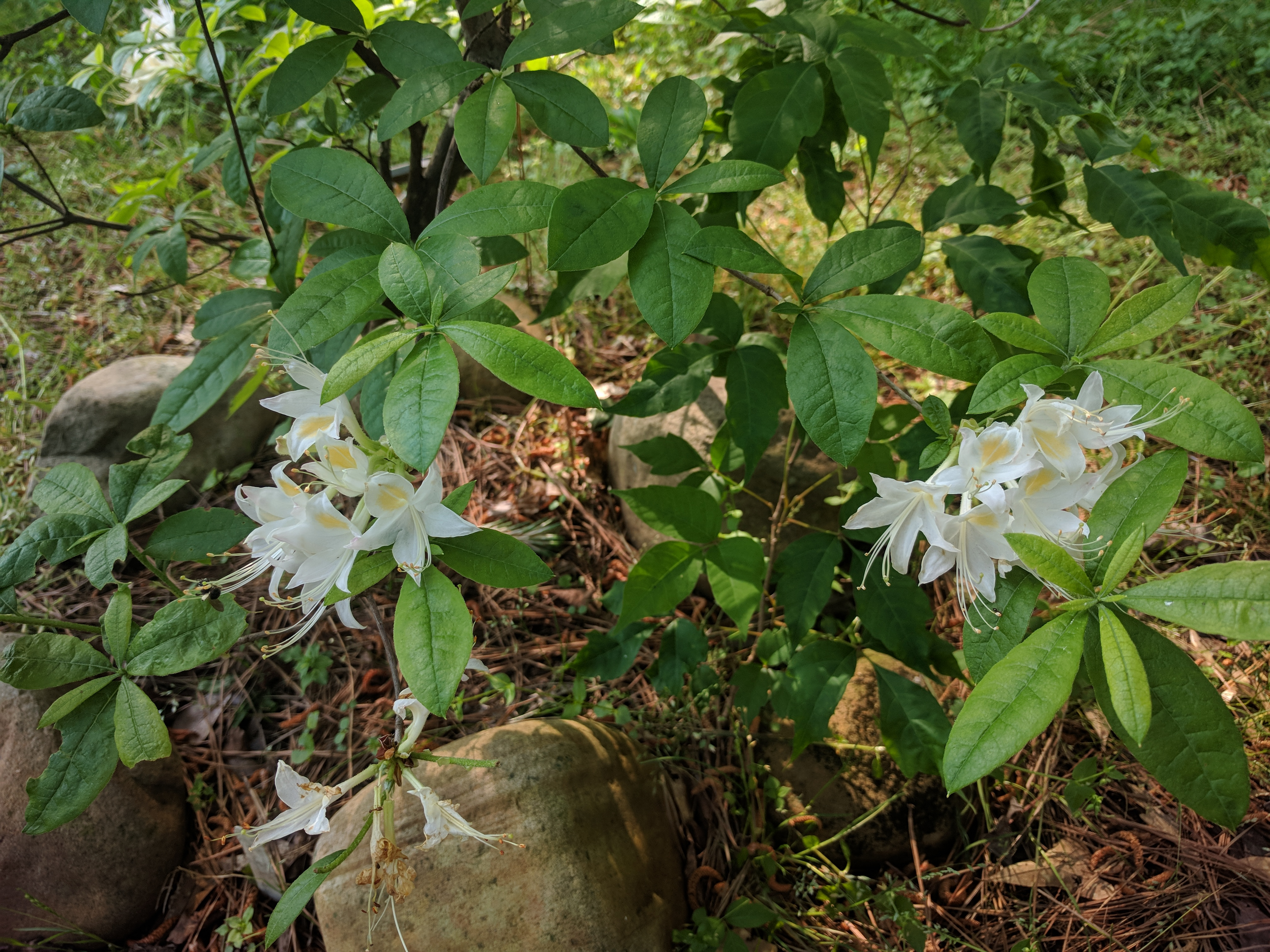
- Rhododendron colemanii at Decatur, Georgia

Scientific classification
- Kingdom: Plantae
- Clade: Tracheophytes
- Clade: Angiosperms
- Clade: Eudicots
- Clade: Asterids
- Order: Ericales
- Family: Ericaceae
- Genus: Rhododendron
- Subgenus: Rhododendron subg. Hymenanthes
- Section: Rhododendron sect. Pentanthera
- Species: R. colemanii

Binomial name
- Rhododendron colemanii R.F.Mill

= Rhododendron colemanii =

Species of azalea

Rhododendron colemanii, the Red Hills azalea, is a species of Rhododendron native to the upper coastal plain of Alabama and western Georgia in the United States. This species was previously confused with Rhododendron alabamense and its hybrids, but was distinguished by DNA sequencing.
