= Honeysuckle Rose =

Honeysuckle Rose may refer to:

- "Honeysuckle Rose" (song), a 1928 jazz standard by Fats Waller and Andy Razaf
- Honeysuckle Rose (film), a 1980 American musical drama starring Willie Nelson, Amy Irving, and Dyan Cannon
  - Honeysuckle Rose (album), the soundtrack to the 1980 movie
