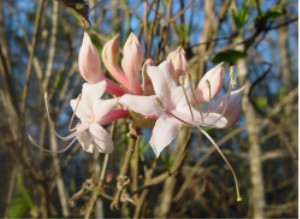

Scientific classification
- Kingdom: Plantae
- Clade: Embryophytes
- Clade: Tracheophytes
- Clade: Angiosperms
- Clade: Eudicots
- Clade: Asterids
- Order: Ericales
- Family: Ericaceae
- Genus: Rhododendron
- Species: R. atlanticum

Binomial name
- Rhododendron atlanticum Rehder

= Rhododendron atlanticum =

Species of flowering bush

Rhododendron atlanticum, the dwarf azalea or coastal azalea, is a species of Rhododendron native to coastal areas of the eastern United States, from New Jersey south to Georgia.

It is a very tough plant, responding to overgrazing or forest fires by generating new shoots.

== Description ==
Rhododendron atlanticum is a compact, loosely branched, deciduous shrub that typically grows to be two to three feet tall at maturity but can grow up to six feet, and is two to three feet wide. It is a deciduous shrub 50–150 cm (20–59 in) tall, forming a thick understory in forests, spreading by underground stolons. The leaves are 3–5 cm long and 1–2 cm broad, bluish green, and hairless or with scattered glandular hairs. The fragrant flowers are 3–4 cm long, usually white to pink, sometimes with a flush of yellow; they are produced in trusses of 4-10 together.

Coastal azalea (Rhododendron atlanticum)

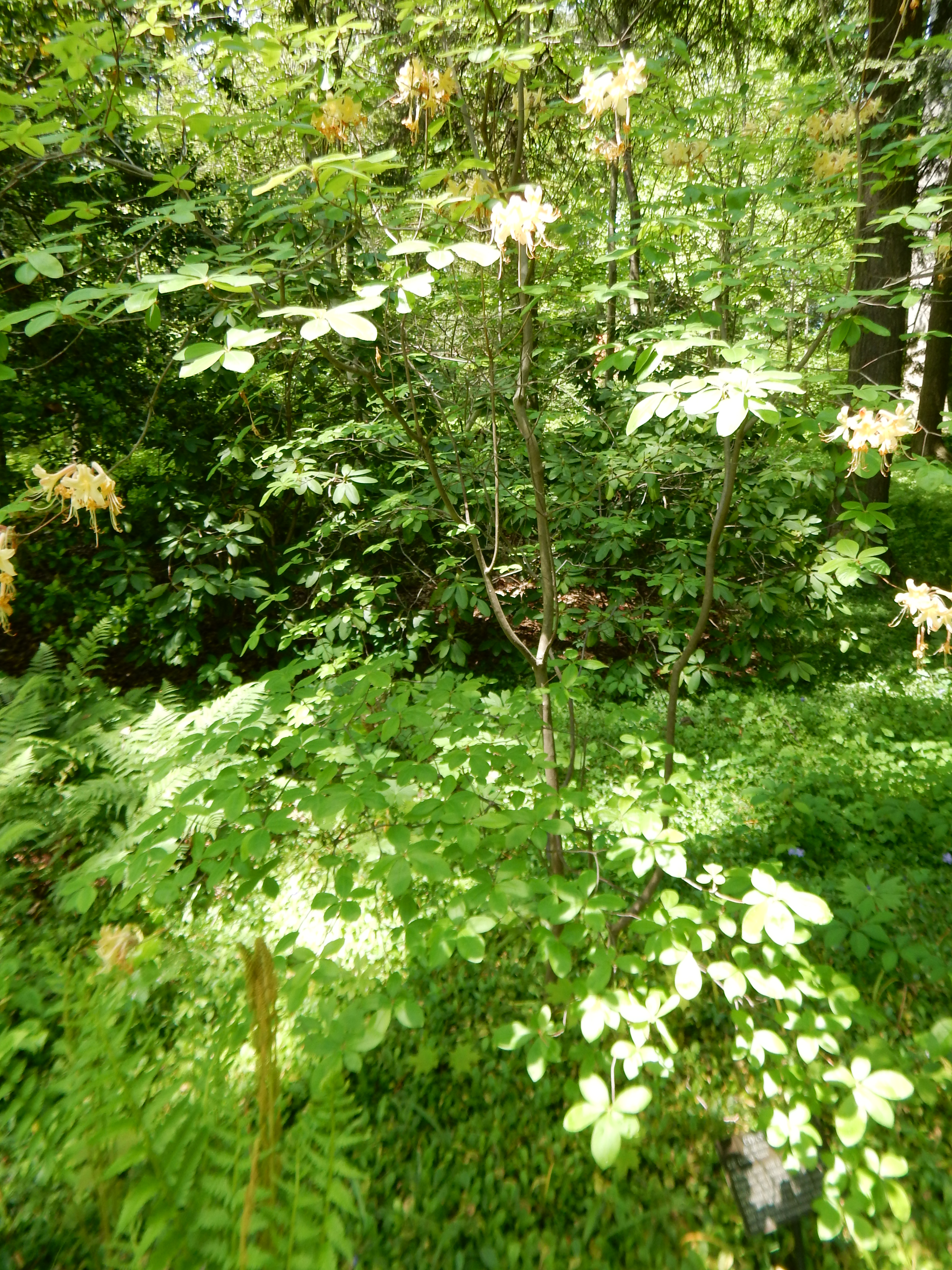
Shrub

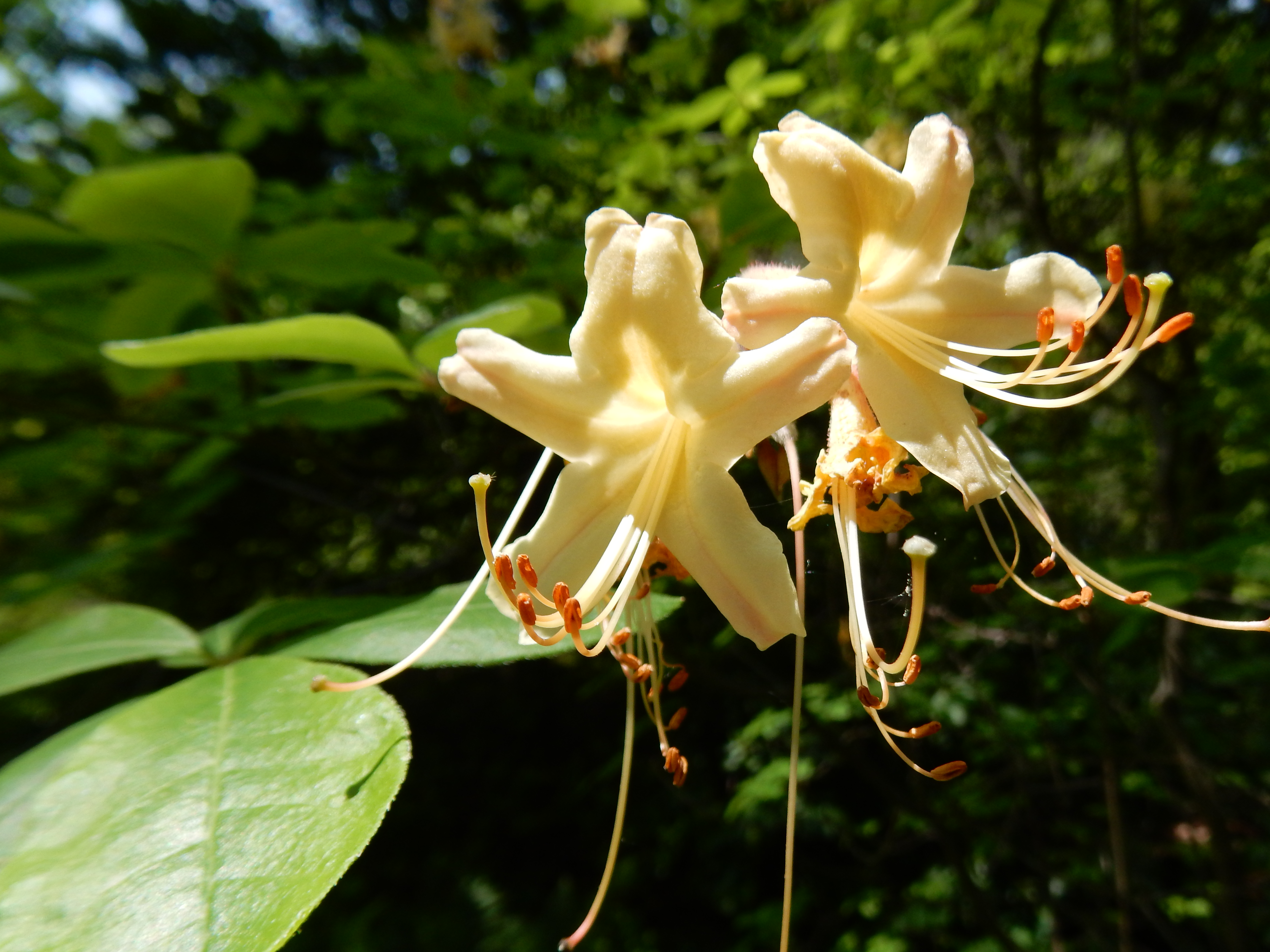
Flowers

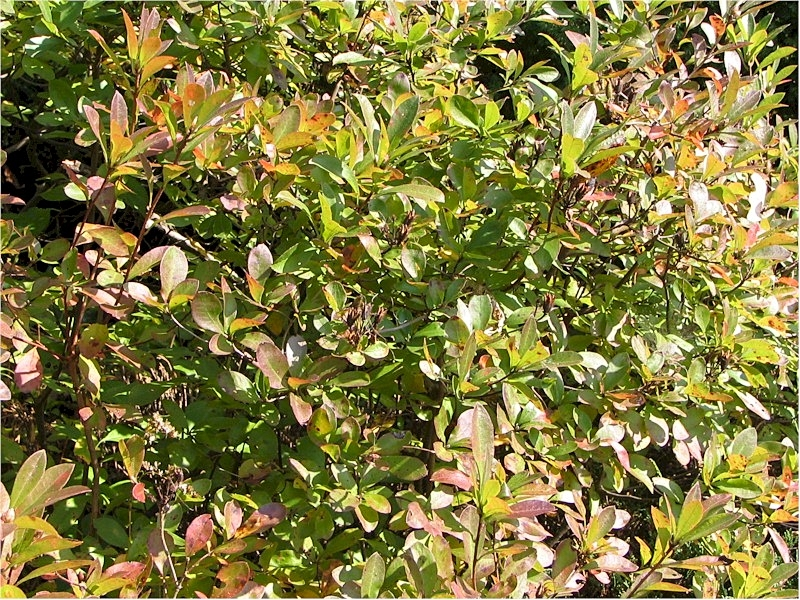
Fall foliage

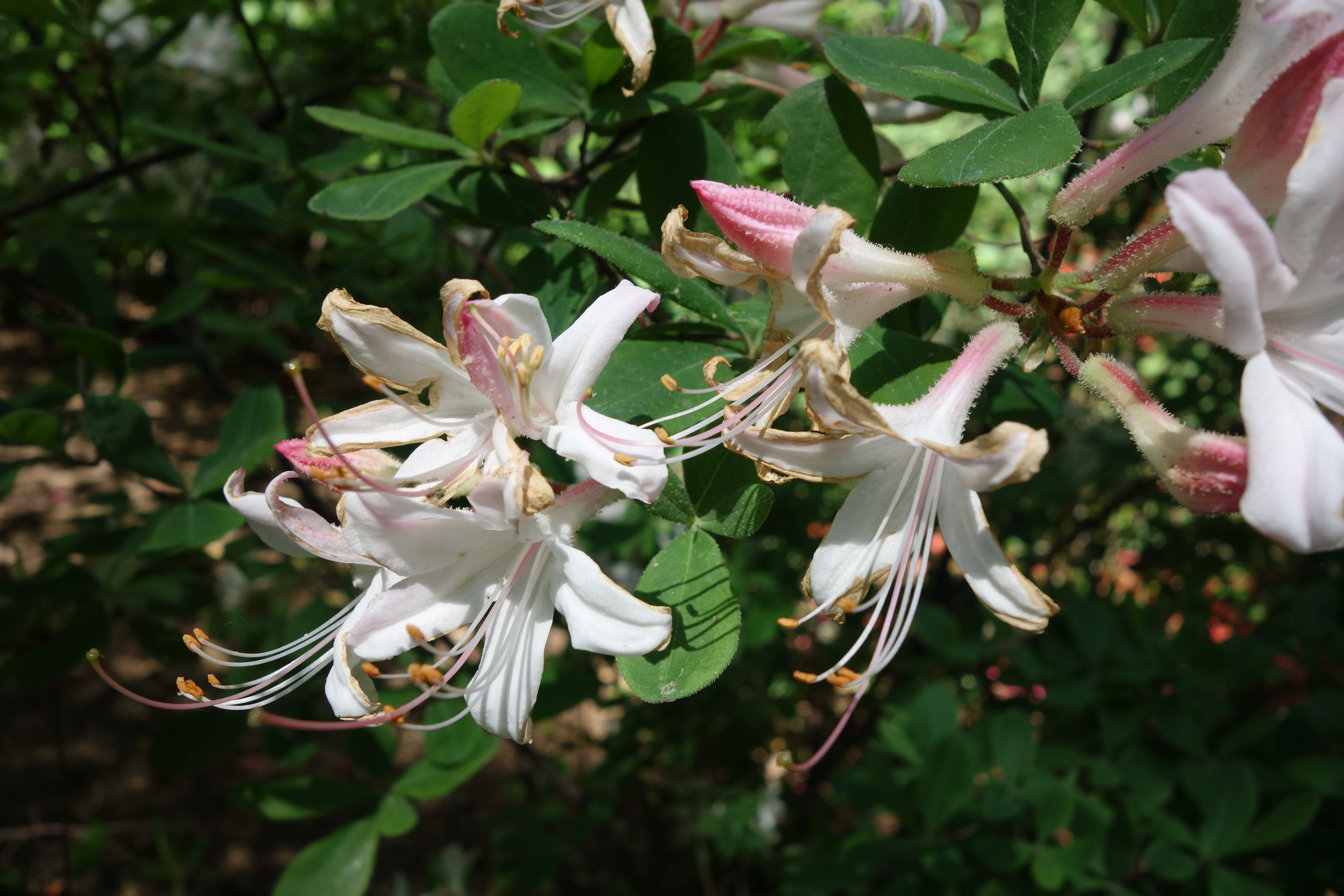
'Choptank River Strain'

== Distribution and habitat ==
Rhododendron atlanticum is found in upland woods, on bluffs, stream banks and open sandy woods. This species ranges from Delaware to Georgia in the mid-Atlantic and southeastern United States.

== Taxonomy ==
Rhododendron atlanticum has nine synonyms listed below:

- Azalea atlantica Ashe
- Azalea atlantica var. luteoalba Coker
- Azalea neglecta Ashe
- Rhododendron atlanticum f. confusum Fernald
- Rhododendron atlanticum f. luteoalbum (Coker) Fernald
- Rhododendron atlanticum var. luteoalbum (Coker) Rehder
- Rhododendron atlanticum f. neglectum (Ashe) Rehder
- Rhododendron atlanticum f. tomolobum Fernald
- Rhododendron neglectum (Ashe) Ashe

== Uses ==
Rhododendron atlanticum can be used in azalea breeding programs for its fragrance. Rhododendron atlanticum is a non-toxic species sometimes available in the nursery trade. This species is often used in landscaping because its fragrance attracts pollinators such as bees, butterflies and hummingbirds as well as it being a showy flower. This species has a medium tolerance to drought and fires, and requires cold stratification for germination. Rhododendron atlanticum produce pinkish-purple flowers in early spring.

== Hybridization ==
The two species that create a hybrid form as a response to herbivory from leaf beetles are Rhododendron periclymenoides and R. atlanticum. Candy Lights is an ornamental hybrid that uses R. atlanticum as a parent plant.
