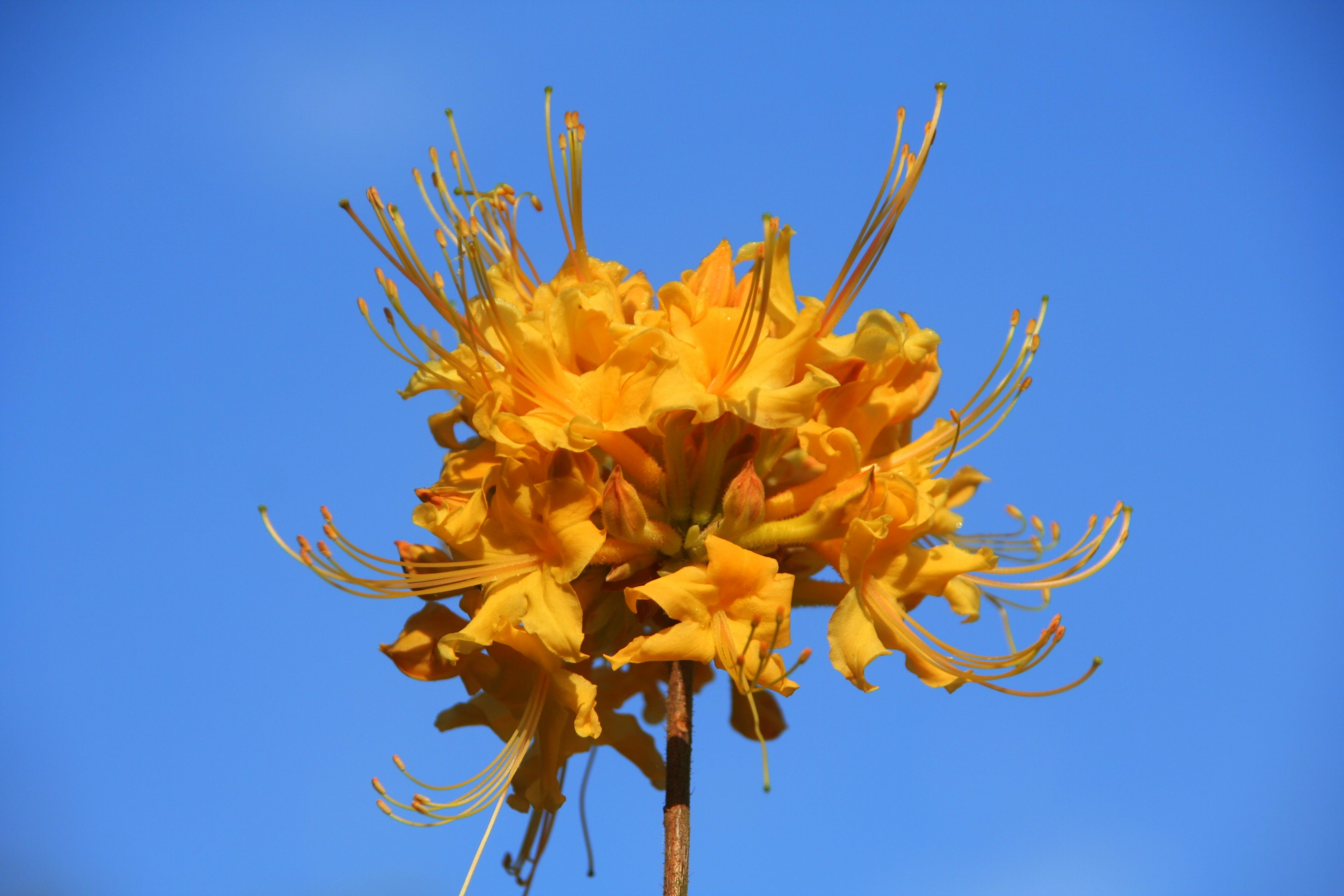

Conservation status
- Vulnerable (NatureServe)

Scientific classification
- Kingdom: Plantae
- Clade: Tracheophytes
- Clade: Angiosperms
- Clade: Eudicots
- Clade: Asterids
- Order: Ericales
- Family: Ericaceae
- Genus: Rhododendron
- Subgenus: Rhododendron subg. Hymenanthes
- Section: Rhododendron sect. Pentanthera
- Species: R. austrinum

Binomial name
- Rhododendron austrinum (Small) Rehder

= Rhododendron austrinum =

Species of plant

Rhododendron austrinum is a species of flowering plant in the heath family known by the common names Florida flame azalea, honeysuckle azalea, southern yellow azalea, and orange azalea. It is native to the southern United States, where it can be found in Alabama, Florida, Georgia, and Mississippi. It is also a common ornamental plant.

This species is a shrub growing up to 10 feet tall and 8 wide. It has deciduous oval leaves 2 to 4 inches long. It blooms profusely in large yellow or orange flowers which have a pleasant scent. The stamens protrude up to 2 inches from the flower's mouth. The funnel-shaped flowers are borne in clusters of up to fifteen. The flowers come in before the new spring leaves emerge.

The plant is a common garden species because of its showy, fragrant flowers in shades of yellow or cream to nearly red. They attract hummingbirds and butterflies.

In the wild, the plant is a regional endemic occurring in and around the Florida Panhandle. It occupies moist and wet acidic substrates in ravines and other areas. It is threatened by the destruction of its habitat during conversion of the land to agriculture, silviculture, and other uses.

== Gallery ==
Rhododendron austrinum in bloom

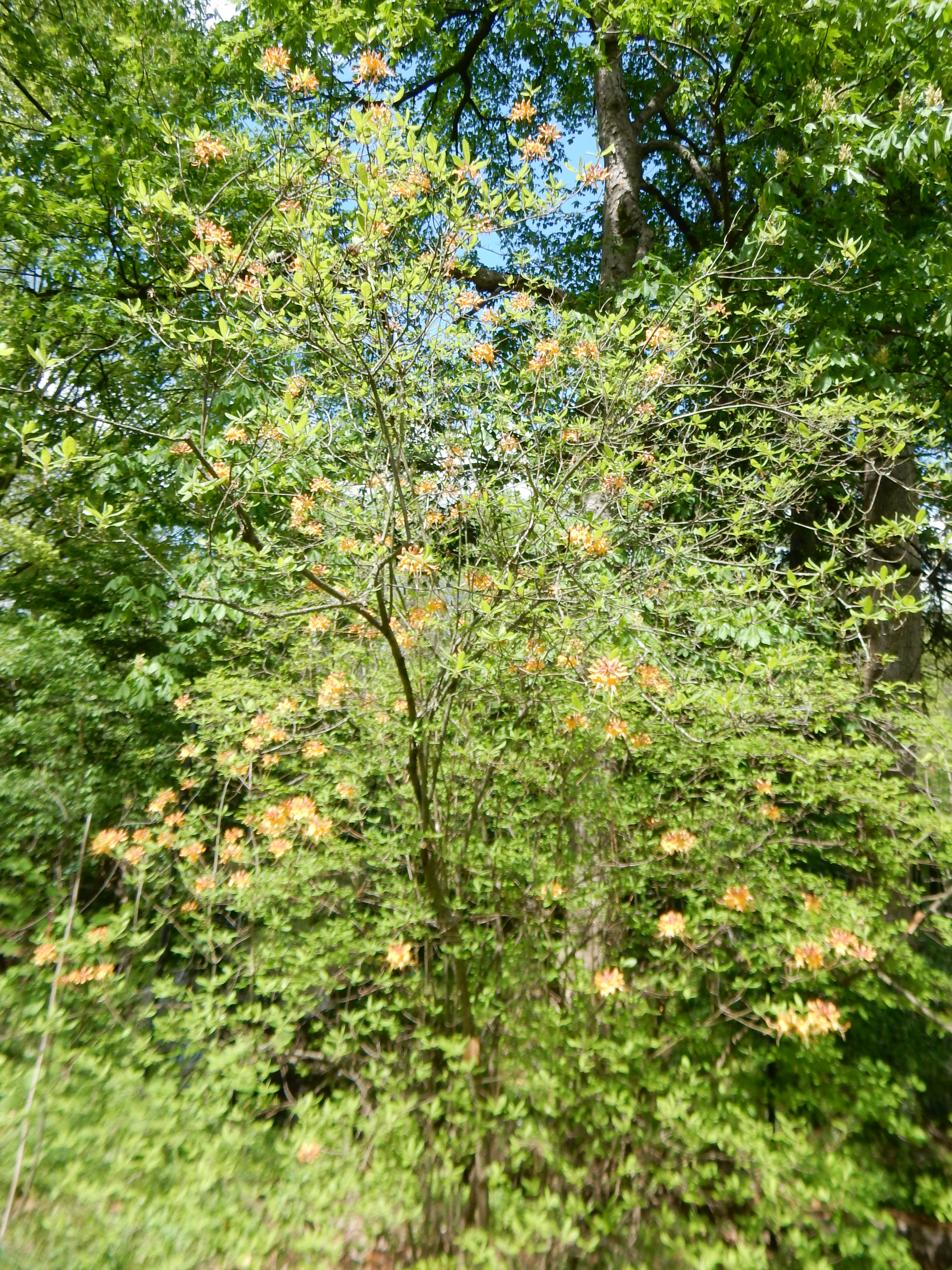

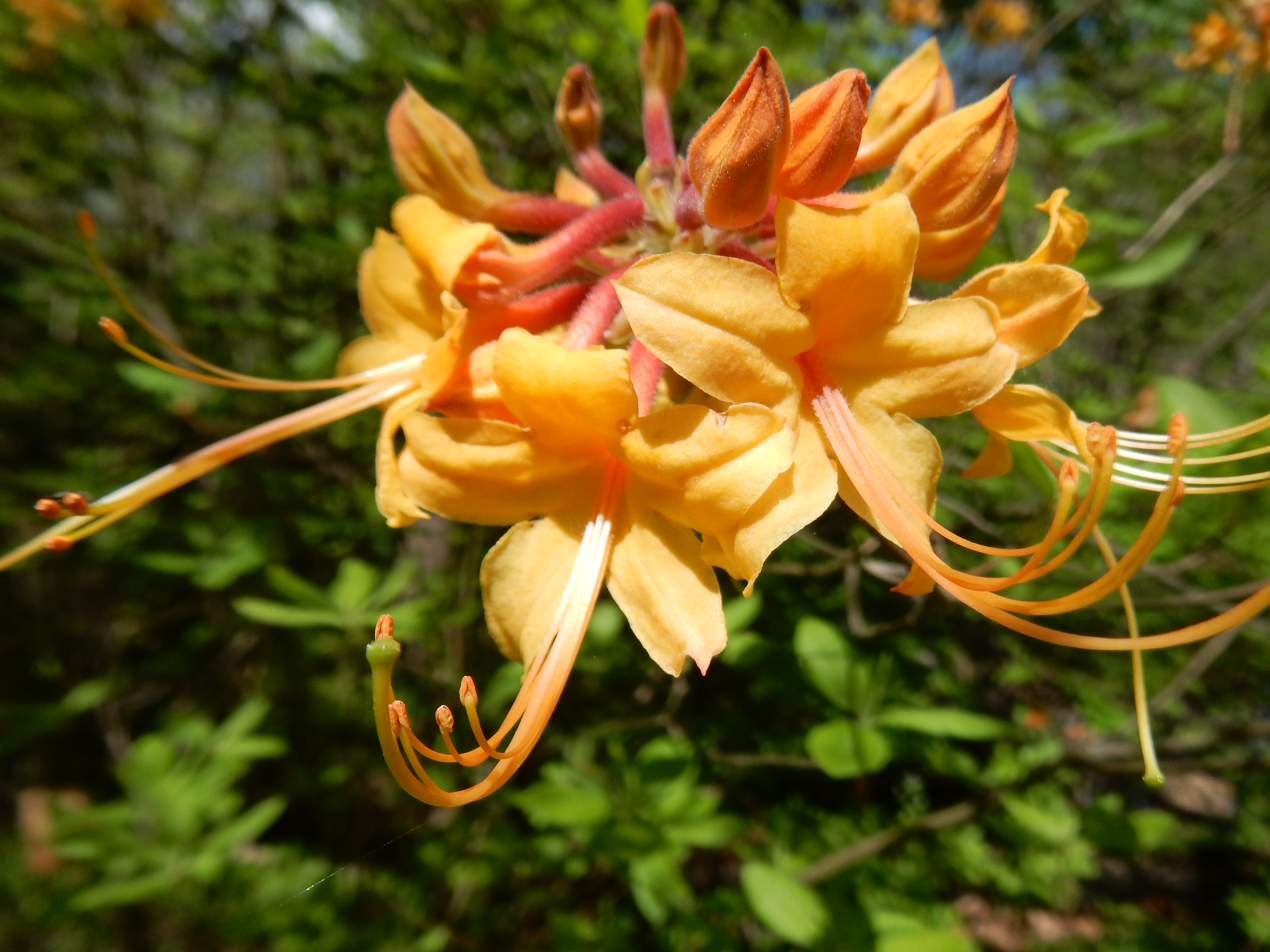

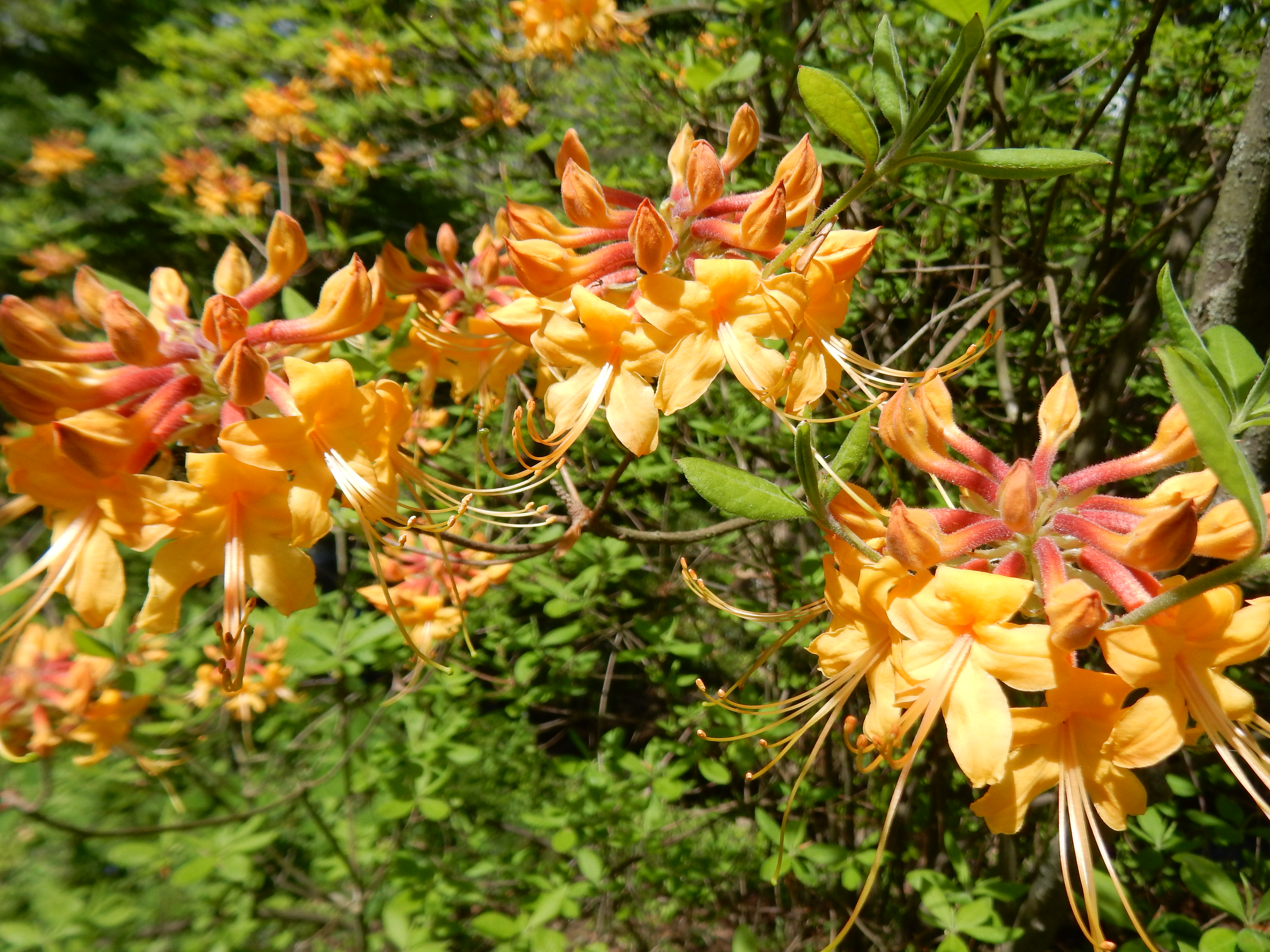

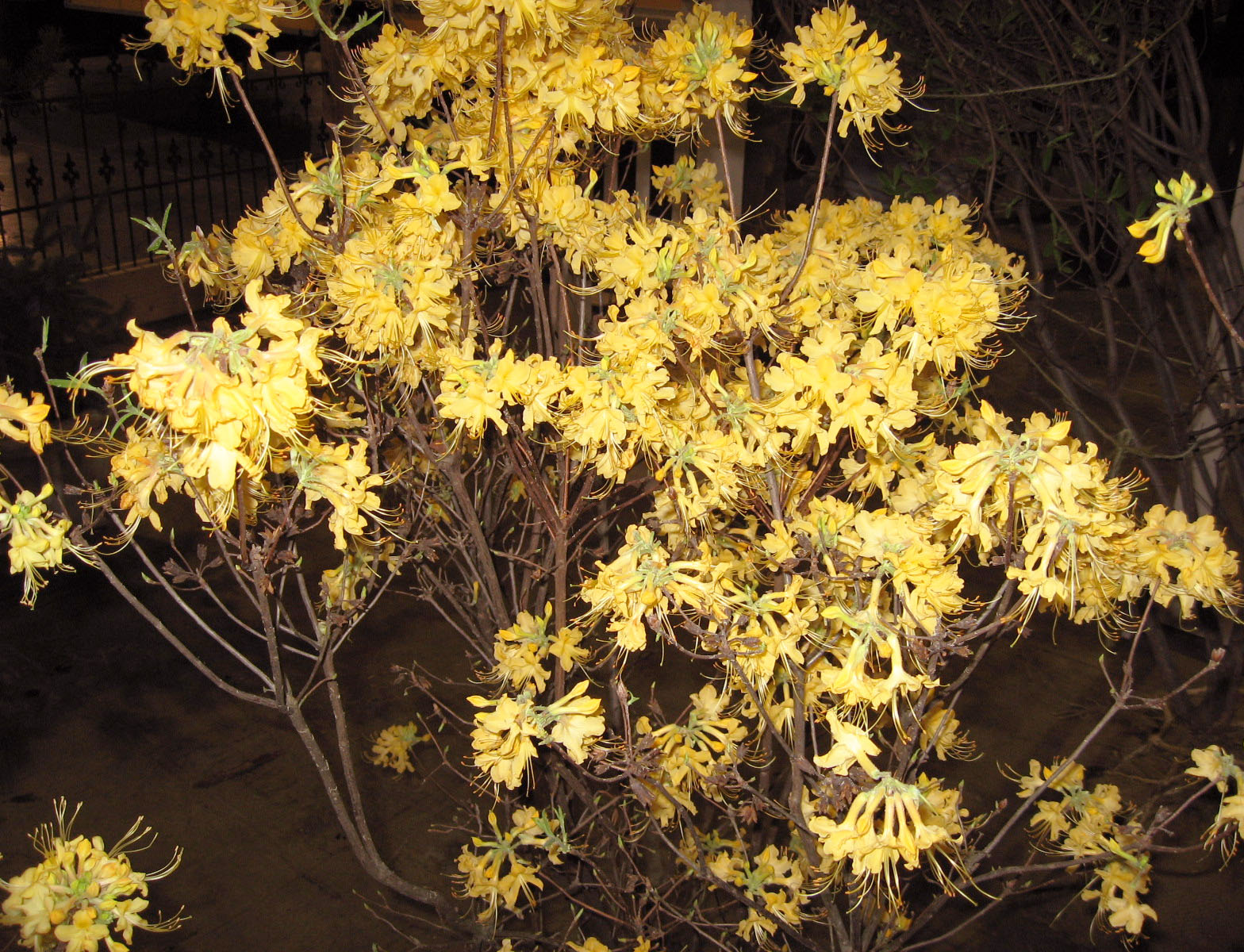
