= Rhododendron eastmanii =

Conservation status
- Vulnerable (NatureServe)

Scientific classification
- Kingdom: Plantae
- Clade: Tracheophytes
- Clade: Angiosperms
- Clade: Eudicots
- Clade: Asterids
- Order: Ericales
- Family: Ericaceae
- Genus: Rhododendron
- Species: R. eastmanii

Binomial name
- Rhododendron eastmanii Kron & Creel

Species of plant

Rhododendron eastmanii, also known as the May white azalea or Eastman's azalea is a species of flowering plant in the heath family (Ericaceae) endemic to the Piedmont and upper Coastal Plain of South Carolina.
