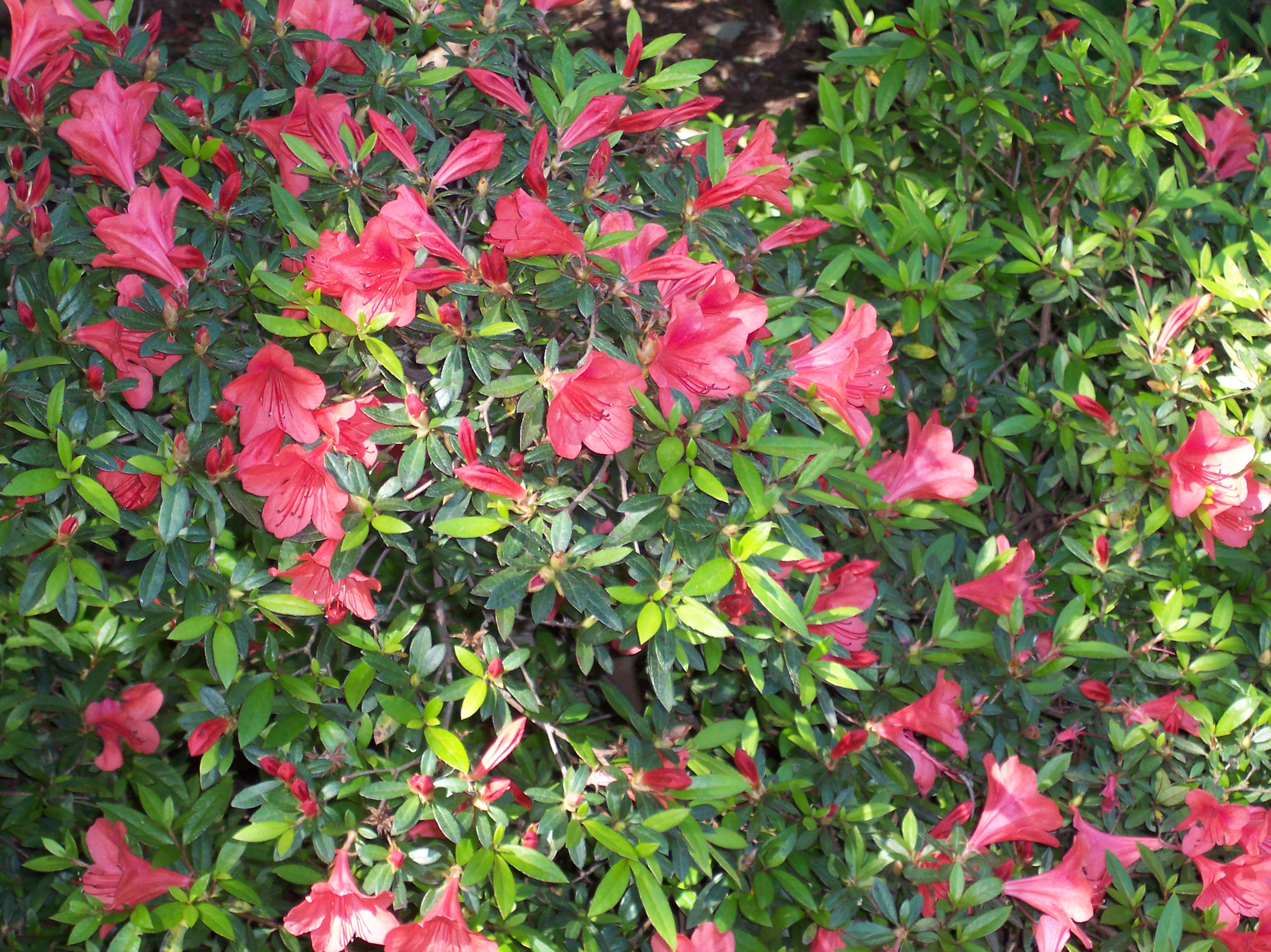

Scientific classification
- Kingdom: Plantae
- Clade: Tracheophytes
- Clade: Angiosperms
- Clade: Eudicots
- Clade: Asterids
- Order: Ericales
- Family: Ericaceae
- Genus: Rhododendron
- Species: R. nakaharae

Binomial name
- Rhododendron nakaharae Hayata

= Rhododendron nakaharae =

Species of plant

Rhododendron nakaharae (那克哈杜鹃) is a rhododendron species native to northern Taiwan, where it grows at altitudes of 700–1,000 m (2,300–3,300 ft). It is a creeping evergreen prostrate shrub growing to 60 cm (24 in) in height, with leaves that are ovate to oblong or oblanceolate to broad-elliptic, 0.6–1.2 by 0.5–1.2 cm in size. The flowers are red.
