= The Wild Honey Suckle =

1786 poem by Philip Freneau

"The Wild Honey Suckle" is a 1786 poem by American author Philip Freneau. Its style and tone is often considered a reaction to the neoclassicism of poets like Alexander Pope and an early anticipation of Romantic poetry. The poem was first printed on July 6, 1786 in the Columbian Herald.

== Themes and critical response ==
The poem describes a secluded honeysuckle and makes observations about mortality. Paul Elmer More praised the "unearthly loveliness" of Freneau's "The Wild Honey Suckle" but noted that "even a clever journeyman's hand could alter a word here and there for the better."
