= Rhododendron alabamense =

Conservation status
- Apparently Secure (NatureServe)

Scientific classification
- Kingdom: Plantae
- Clade: Tracheophytes
- Clade: Angiosperms
- Clade: Eudicots
- Clade: Asterids
- Order: Ericales
- Family: Ericaceae
- Genus: Rhododendron
- Species: R. alabamense

Binomial name
- Rhododendron alabamense Rehder

Species of plant

Rhododendron alabamense, also known as the Alabama azalea, is a species of flowering plant in the heath family (Ericaceae) endemic to moist slopes, bluffs, and streambanks of the southeastern US, in Alabama, Georgia, Mississippi, Tennessee, and Florida.
