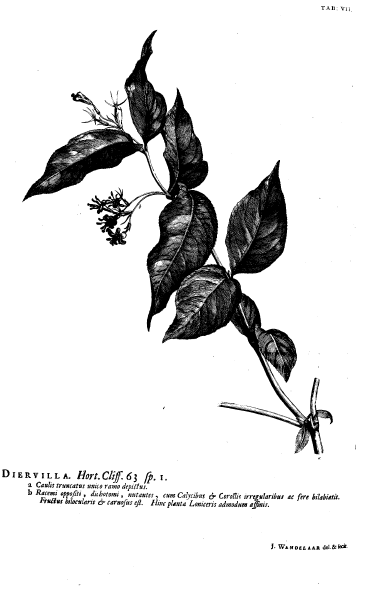

Scientific classification
- Kingdom: Plantae
- Clade: Embryophytes
- Clade: Tracheophytes
- Clade: Spermatophytes
- Clade: Angiosperms
- Clade: Eudicots
- Clade: Asterids
- Order: Dipsacales
- Family: Caprifoliaceae
- Subfamily: Diervilloideae
- Genus: Diervilla; Tourn. ex Mill.

Species
- See text

= Diervilla =

Bush honeysuckle

Genus of flowering plants in the honeysuckle family

Diervilla, or bush honeysuckle, is a genus of three species of deciduous shrubs in the family Caprifoliaceae, all indigenous to eastern North America. The genus is named after a French surgeon Dr. Marin Diereville, who introduced the plant to Europe around 1700.

The bush honeysuckles are low in height, 1–2 m (3–7 ft), of small to medium diameter, 1–2 m (3–7 ft), and develop into colonies by means of spreading underground rhizomes. Their leaves are simple, opposite and either oval or lanceolate in shape with a toothed edge. The fall color varies between yellow, orange and red. Small tubular flowers, typically pale yellow, are produced in June and July.

== Species ==
Image	Common name	Scientific name	Distribution
	northern bush honeysuckle (other names low bush honeysuckle, dwarf bush honeysuckle, yellow-flowered upright honeysuckle)	Diervilla lonicera	from Northern Quebec and Labrador to Georgia and Alabama and reaches as far west as Saskatchewan
	mountain bush honeysuckle (other names Georgia bush honeysuckle, hairy bush honeysuckle)	Diervilla rivularis	Alabama, Georgia and Tennessee.
	southern bush honeysuckle	Diervilla sessilifolia	the Great Smoky Mountains and the southern Appalachian Mountains

Other species formerly included in Diervilla are now treated in the genus Weigela. The bush honeysuckles are commonly confused with the common wild honeysuckle (Lonicera tatarica), or the Japanese honeysuckle (Lonicera japonica), both members of the closely related genus Lonicera.

The British Diervilla national collection is held at Sheffield Botanical Gardens; along with the national collection of the closely related genus Weigela.

Diervilla species are used as food plants by the larvae of some Lepidoptera species including the common emerald and the engrailed moths.
