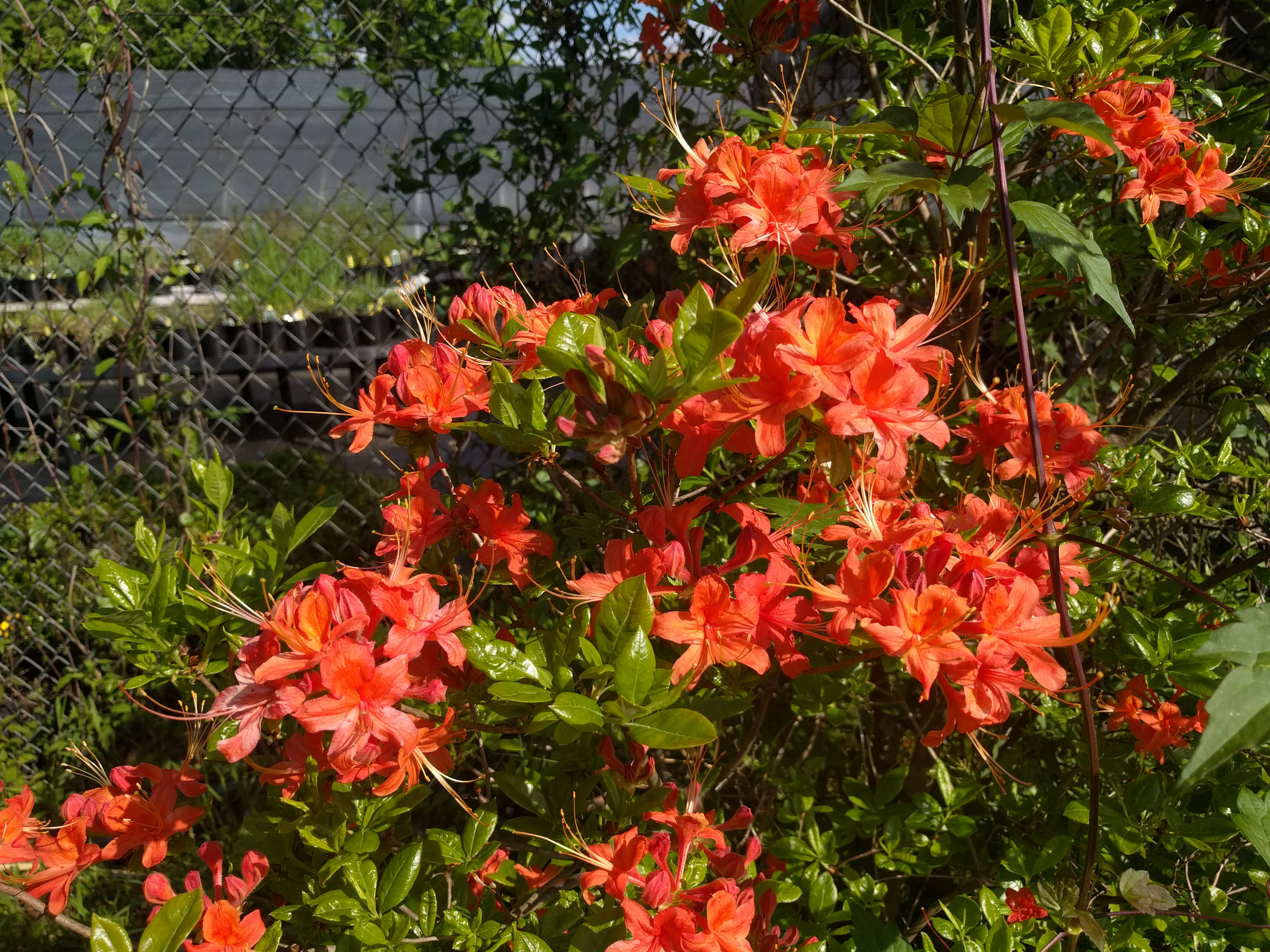

Scientific classification
- Kingdom: Plantae
- Clade: Tracheophytes
- Clade: Angiosperms
- Clade: Eudicots
- Clade: Asterids
- Order: Ericales
- Family: Ericaceae
- Genus: Rhododendron
- Species: R. flammeum

Binomial name
- Rhododendron flammeum (Michx.) Sarg.

Synonyms
- Azalea calendulacea var. flammea Michx.

= Rhododendron flammeum =

Oconee azalea

Species of plant

Rhododendron flammeum, the Piedmont azalea or Oconee azalea, is a plant species native to the US states of Georgia and South Carolina. It is found in dry woods and stream bluffs at elevations less than 500 m. The common name is taken from Oconee County, South Carolina.

Rhododendron flammeum is a deciduous shrub up to 2.5 m tall, usually not producing rhizomes. The leaves are thin, ovate, and up to 9 cm long, without teeth. The inflorescences have up to 12 flowers each. The flowers open in the Spring before the leaves have formed. The flowers are funnel-shaped, up to 50 mm long and bright red to orange with a darker splotch on the upper lobe.
