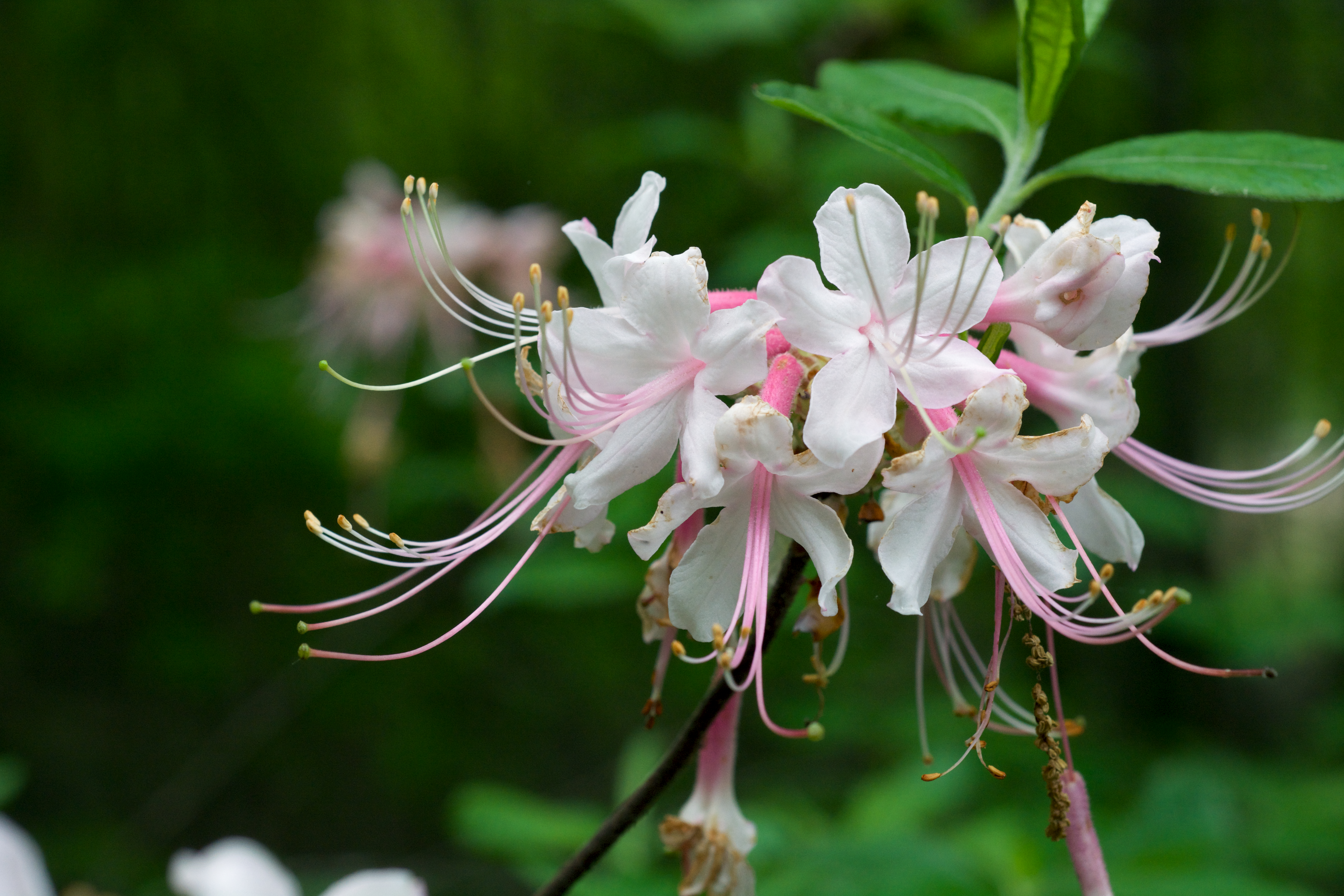

Scientific classification
- Kingdom: Plantae
- Clade: Tracheophytes
- Clade: Angiosperms
- Clade: Eudicots
- Clade: Asterids
- Order: Ericales
- Family: Ericaceae
- Genus: Rhododendron
- Species: R. canescens

Binomial name
- Rhododendron canescens (Michx.) Sweet

= Rhododendron canescens =

Species of flowering bush

Rhododendron canescens, the piedmont azalea or mountain azalea, or wild azalea, or native azalea, or dead man’s handkerchief is a pink-blooming azalea native to the Eastern United States.

R. canescens may reach a height of 5 meters (approximately 16.4 feet).

This species' range extends from Pennsylvania to Texas, sans Virginia and West Virginia. It has been observed in habitat types such as swamps, savannas, flatwoods, and woodlands.
