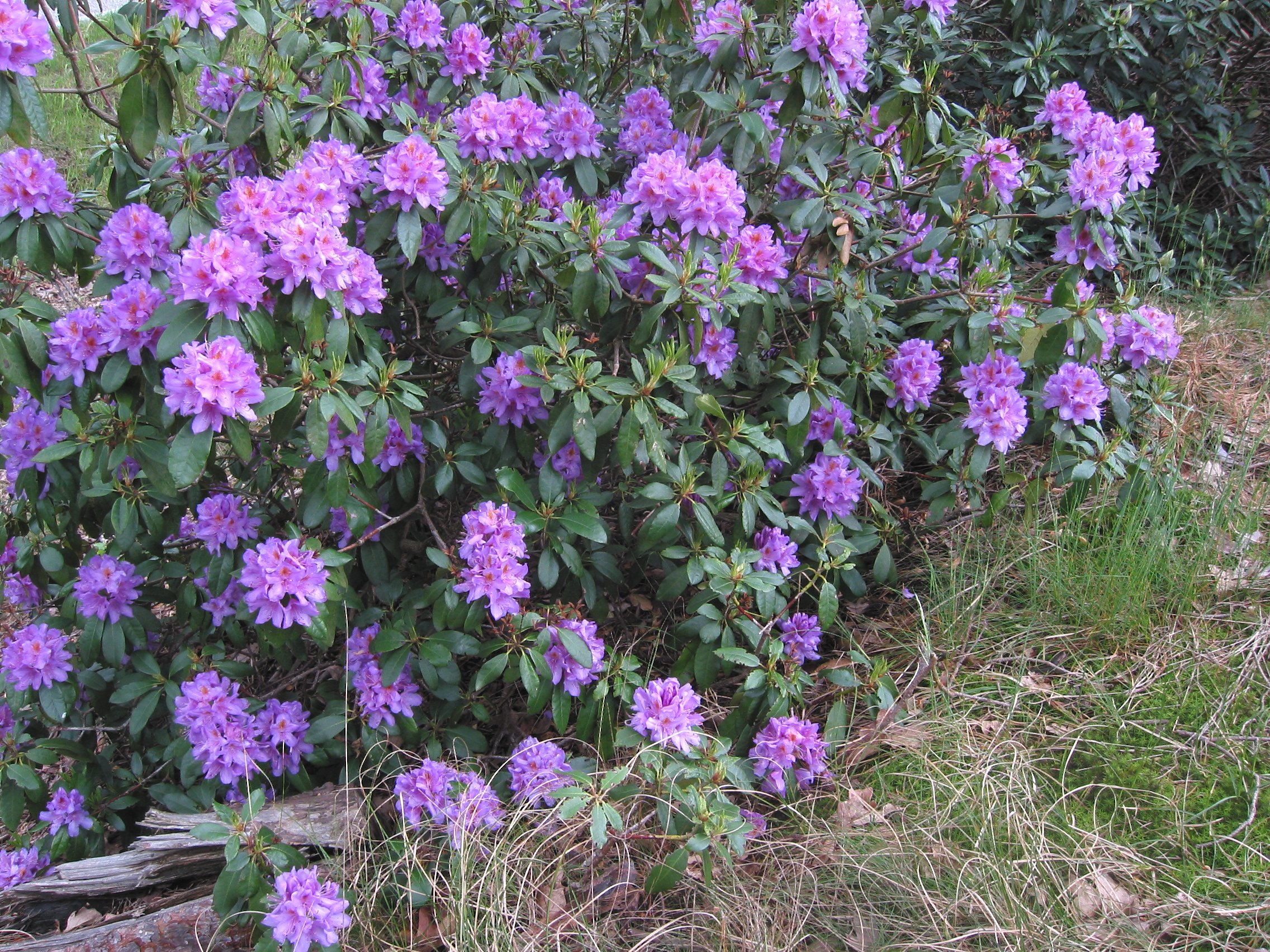
- Rhododendron ponticum

Scientific classification
- Kingdom: Plantae
- Clade: Embryophytes
- Clade: Tracheophytes
- Clade: Spermatophytes
- Clade: Angiosperms
- Clade: Eudicots
- Clade: Asterids
- Order: Ericales
- Family: Ericaceae
- Genus: Rhododendron
- Subgenus: Rhododendron subg. Hymenanthes (Blume) K.Koch

Sections
- Ponticum; Pentanthera

= Rhododendron subg. Hymenanthes =

Subgenus of flowering plants

Rhododendron subg. Hymenanthes is a subgenus of the genus Rhododendron, with a widespread distribution in the temperate Northern Hemisphere. The species are evergreen shrubs and small to medium-sized trees (up to 20 m tall), with medium-sized to large leaves (very large, over 40 cm long, in a few species). The flowers are large, produced in terminal trusses of 5-40 together.

The subgenus includes two sections, Rhododendron sect. Ponticum, divided into 24 subsections and about 140 species, and (since 2005) Rhododendron sect. Pentanthera.

== Cultivation ==
This subgenus includes the majority of the larger evergreen rhododendrons widely grown as ornamental plants. Some species, notably Rhododendron ponticum, have escaped from cultivation and become invasive in some regions such as New Zealand.

== Ponticum ==
Section Ponticum (24 subsections) includes:

- R. subsect. Arborea (4 species)
- R. subsect. Argyrophylla (23 species)
- R. subsect. Barbata (2 species)
- R. subsect. Campanulata (2 species)
- R. subsect. Campylocarpa (4 species)
- R. subsect. Falconera (7 species)
- R. subsect. Fortunea (39 species)
- R. subsect. Fulgensia (2 species)
- R. subsect. Fulva (2 species)
- R. subsect. Glischra (5 species)
- R. subsect. Grandia (9 species)
- R. subsect. Griersoniana (one species, R. griersonianum)
- R. subsect. Irrorata (7 species)
- R. subsect. Lanata (6 species)
- R. subsect. Maculifera (6 species)
- R. subsect. Neriiflora (19 species)
- R. subsect. Parishia (3 species)
- R. subsect. Pontica (13 species)
- R. subsect. Selensia (5 species)
- R. subsect. Taliensia (20 species)
- R. subsect. Thomsonia (7 species)
- R. subsect. Venatora (one species, R. venator)
- R. subsect. Williamsiana (one species, R. williamsianum)

=== Arborea ===
Rhododendron subsect. Arborea is a subsection of section Ponticum in Hymenanthes consisting of 4 species of trees native to East Asia.

Image	Name	Distribution
	Rhododendron arboreum Smith 1805	China (Guizhou, S Xizang), Bhutan, India, Kashmir, Nepal, Sikkim, Sri Lanka, Thailand, Vietnam
	Rhododendron delavayi Franchet 1886	China (Guangxi, Guizhou, Sichuan, Xizang, Yunnan), Bhutan, India, Myanmar, Thailand, Vietnam
	Rhododendron lanigerum Tagg 1930	China (Xizang), India
	Rhododendron niveum J. D. Hooker 1852	China (Xizang), Bhutan, India (Sikkim)

=== Argyrophylla ===
Rhododendron subsect. Argyrophylla is a subsection of section Ponticum in Hymenanthes consisting of 23 species of shrubss native to East Asia. This section is distinguished by its silvery white, pale yellow or yellowish-brown hairs on the abaxial leaf surface.

Image	Name	Distribution
	Rhododendron adenopodum Franch. 1895	China ( Chongqing, Hubei)
	Rhododendron argyrophyllum Franch. 1886	China (Guizhou, Sichuan, Yunnan)
	Rhododendron brevipetiolatum M.Y.Fang 1984	China (Sichuan)
	Rhododendron coryanum Tagg & Forrest 1926	China ( Xizang, Yunnan)
	Rhododendron denudatum H.Lév. 1914	China (Guizhou, Sichuan, Yunnan)
	Rhododendron ebianense M.Y.Fang	China (Sichuan )
	Rhododendron eriobotryoides Xiang Chen & Jia Y.Huang 2010	China (Guizhou)
	Rhododendron fangchengense P.C.Tam 1982	China (Guizhou)
	Rhododendron farinosum H.Lév.	China (Yunnan)
	Rhododendron floribundum Franch. 1886	China (Guizhou, Sichuan, Yunnan.)
	Rhododendron formosanum Hemsl. 1895	Taiwan
	Rhododendron haofui Chun & W.P.Fang 1957	China (Guangxi, Guizhou, Hunan, Jiangxi, Yunnan)
	Rhododendron hunnewellianum Rehder & E.H.Wilson 1913	China (Gansu, Sichuan)
	Rhododendron hypoglaucum Hemsl. 1889	China (Chongqing, Hubei, Shaanxi, Sichuan.)
	Rhododendron insigne Hemsl. & E.H.Wilson 1910	China (Sichuan.)
	Rhododendron longipes Rehder & E.H.Wilson 1913	China (Chongqing, Guizhou, Sichuan, Yunnan.)
	Rhododendron oblancifolium M.Y.Fang 1988	China (Guizhou)
	Rhododendron pingianum W.P.Fang 1939	China (Sichuan)
	Rhododendron pudiense Xiang Chen & Jia Y.Huang 2010	China (Guizhou)
	Rhododendron ririei Hemsl. & E.H.Wilson 1910	China (Sichuan)
	Rhododendron shimenense Q.X.Liu & C.M.Zhang 1991	China (Hunan)
	Rhododendron simiarum Hance 1881	China (Anhui, Fujian, Guangdong, Guangxi, Guizhou, Hainan, Hunan, Jiangxi, Zhejiang)
	Rhododendron thayerianum Rehder & E.H.Wilson 1913	China (Sichuan)

=== Barbata ===
Rhododendron subsect. Barbata is a subsection of section Ponticum in Hymenanthes consisting of 5 species of small trees native to East Asia.

Image	Name	Distribution
	Rhododendron argipeplum Balf.f. & R.E.Cooper 1916	China (Xizang), Bhutan, India (Sikkim)
	Rhododendron barbatum Wall. ex G.Don 1834	China (Xizang), Bhutan, India (Sikkim), Nepal
	Rhododendron erosum Cowan 1937	China (Xizang), Arunachal Pradesh
	Rhododendron exasperatum Tagg 1930	China (Xizang), India, Myanmar
	Rhododendron succothii Davidian 1965	Bhutan, India (W Arunachal Pradesh)

=== Campanulata ===
Rhododendron subsect. Campanulata is a subsection of section Ponticum in Hymenanthes consisting of 2 species of shrubs native to East Asia.

Image	Name	Distribution
	Rhododendron campanulatum D. Don 1821	China (Xizang), Bhutan, India (Kashmir, Sikkim, Himachal Pradesh), Nepal
	Rhododendron gannanense Z. C. Feng & X. G. Sun 1992	China (Gansu)

=== Campylocarpa ===
Rhododendron subsect. Campylocarpa is a subsection of section Ponticum in Hymenanthes consisting of 6 species of shrubs with campanulate shaped flowers native to East Asia.

Image	Name	Distribution
	Rhododendron callimorphum Balf.f. & W.W.Sm. 1917	China (Yunnan), Myanmar
	Rhododendron campylocarpum Hook.f. 1851	China (Xizang, Yunnan) Bhutan, India (Sikkim), Myanmar, Nepal,
	Rhododendron henanense W.P.Fang 1983	China (Henan)
	Rhododendron longicalyx M.Y.Fang 1988	China (Sichuan)
	Rhododendron souliei Franch. 1895	China (Sichuan, Xizang)
	Rhododendron wardii W.W.Sm. 1914	China (Sichuan, Xizang, Yunnan)

=== Falconera ===
Rhododendron subsect. Falconera is a subsection of section Ponticum in Hymenanthes consisting of 14 species of shrubs and trees with thick leaves that have yellow veins and red brown hairs on the underside that are native to East Asia.

Image	Name	Distribution
	Rhododendron arizelum Balf.f. & Forrest 1920	China (Xizang, Yunnan), Myanmar
	Rhododendron basilicum Balf.f. & W.W.Sm. 1916	China (Yunnan), Myanmar
	Rhododendron coriaceum Franch. 1898	China (Xizang, Yunnan)
	Rhododendron falconeri Hook.f. 1849	Nepal, India (Sikkim, Arunachal Pradesh, West Bengal), Bhutan
	Rhododendron fictolacteum Balf.f. 1916	China (Sichuan, Xizang, Yunnan), Myanmar
	Rhododendron galactinum Balf.f. ex Tagg 1926	China (Sichuan)
	Rhododendron hodgsonii Hook.f. 1851	China (Xizang), Bhutan, India (Sikkim), Nepal
	Rhododendron mechukae A.A.Mao & A.Paul 2013	India (Arunachal Pradesh)
	Rhododendron preptum Balf.f. & Forrest 1920	China (Yunnan), Myanmar
	Rhododendron rex H.Lév. 1914	China (Sichuan, Xizang, Yunnan) Myanmar
	Rhododendron rothschildii Davidian 1972	China (Yunnan)
	Rhododendron semnoides Tagg & Forrest 1926	China (Xizang, Yunnan)
	Rhododendron sinofalconeri Balf.f. 1916	China (Yunnan), Vietnam
	Rhododendron titapuriense A.A.Mao, K.N.E.Cox & D.F.Chamb. 2013	India (Arunachal Pradesh)

=== Fortunea ===
Rhododendron subsect. Fortunea is a subsection of section Ponticum in Hymenanthes consisting of 37 species of shrubs or trees native to East Asia.

Image	Name	Distribution
	Rhododendron asterochnoum Diels 1921	China (Sichuan)
	Rhododendron auriculatum Hemsl. 1889	China (Shaanxi, Guizhou)
	Rhododendron bailiense Y.P.Ma, Zhang & D.F.Chamb. 2015	China (Guizhou)
	Rhododendron calophytum Franch. 1886	China (Chongqing, Gansu, Guizhou, Hubei, Shaanxi, Sichuan, Yunnan)
	Rhododendron chihsinianum Chun & W.P.Fang 1957	China (Guangxi)
	Rhododendron davidii Franch. 1886	China (Sichuan, Yunnan)
	Rhododendron decorum Franch. 1886	China (Guizhou, SW Sichuan, SE Xizang, Yunnan), Myanmar
	Rhododendron discolor Franch. 1895	China (Anhui, Chongqing, Guangxi, Guizhou, Hubei, Hunan, Jiangxi, Shaanxi, Sichuan, Yunnan, Zhejiang)
	Rhododendron faithiae Chun 1934	China (Guangdong, Guangxi)
	Rhododendron fortunei Lindl. 1859	China (Anhui, Fujian, Guangdong, Guangxi, Guizhou, Henan, Hubei, Hunan, Jiangxi, Shaanxi, Sichuan, Yunnan, Zhejiang)
	Rhododendron glanduliferum Franch. 1886	China (Yunnan)
	Rhododendron griffithianum Wight 1848	China (Xizang), Bhutan, N India, E Nepal, Sikkim
	Rhododendron guihainianum G.Z.Li 1995	China (Guangxi)
	Rhododendron hemsleyanum E.H.Wilson 1910	China (Sichuan)
	Rhododendron huangpingense Xiang Chen & Jia Y.Huang 2010	China (Guizhou)
	Rhododendron huanum W.P.Fang 1939	China (Chongqing, Guizhou, Sichuan, Yunnan)
	Rhododendron jinchangense Z.H.Yang 1997	China (Yunnan)
	Rhododendron jingangshanicum P.C.Tam 1982	China (Jiangxi)
	Rhododendron jiulongshanense Xiang Chen & Jia Y.Huang 2010	China (Guizhou)
	Rhododendron leigongshanense C.H.Yang, Z.G.Xie, Y.F.Yu & Z.R.Yang 2015	China (Guizhou)
	Rhododendron liboense Zheng R.Chen & K.M.Lan 2003	China (Guizhou)
	Rhododendron magniflorum W.K.Hu 1988	China (Guizhou)
	Rhododendron maoerense W.P.Fang & G.Z.Li 1984	China (Guangxi)
	Rhododendron miyiense W.K.Hu 1988	China (Sichuan)
	Rhododendron nymphaeoides W.K.Hu 1988	China (Sichuan)
	Rhododendron orbiculare Decne. 1877	China (Guangxi, Sichuan)
	Rhododendron oreodoxa Franch. 1886	China (Gansu, Hubei, Shaanxi, Sichuan, Xizang)
	Rhododendron platypodum Diels 1900	China (Chongqing)
	Rhododendron praeteritum Hutch. 1922	China (Gansu, Hubei, Hunan, Qinghai)
	Rhododendron praevernum Hutch. 1920	China (Guizhou, Hubei, Shaanxi, Sichuan, Yunnan)
	Rhododendron qiaojiaense L.M.Gao & D.Z.Li 2009	China (Yunnan)
	Rhododendron serotinum Hutch.	China (Yunnan), Vietnam
	Rhododendron sutchuenense Franch. 1895	China (Chongqing, Gansu, Guangxi, Guizhou, Hubei, Hunan, Shaanxi)
	Rhododendron vernicosum Franch. 1898	China (Sichuan, Xizang, Yunnan)
	Rhododendron verruciferum W.K.Hu 1989	China (Sichuan)
	Rhododendron wolongense W.K.Hu 1988	China (Sichuan)
	Rhododendron xiaoxidongense W.K.Hu 1990	China (Jiangxi)

=== Fulgensia ===
Rhododendron subsect. Fulgensia is a subsection of section Ponticum in Hymenanthes consisting of 3 species of shrubs with glossy leaves that have dark brown hairs on the underside native to East Asia.

Image	Name	Distribution
	Rhododendron fulgens Hook.f. 1851	China (Xizang), Bhutan, India (Sikkim), Nepal
	Rhododendron miniatum Cowan 1937	China (Xizang)
	Rhododendron rawatii I.D.Rai & B.S.Adhikari 2020	India (Uttarakhand)

=== Fulva ===
Rhododendron subsect. Fulva is a subsection of section Ponticum in Hymenanthes comprising 2 species of shrubs native to East Asia.

Image	Name	Distribution
	Rhododendron fulvum B. Balfour & W. W. Smith 1917	China (Sichuan, Xizang, W Yunnan), Myanmar
	Rhododendron uvariifolium Diels 1912	China (Sichuan, Xizang, Yunnan)

=== Glischrum ===
Rhododendron subsect. Glischrum is a subsection of section Ponticum in Hymenanthes comprising 9 species of shrubs native to East Asia.

Image	Name	Distribution
	Rhododendron adenosum (Cowan & Davidian) Davidian 1978	China (Sichuan)
	Rhododendron crinigerum Franch. 1898	China (Sichuan, Xizang, Yunnan)
	Rhododendron diphrocalyx Balf.f. 1919	China (Yunnan)
	Rhododendron glischroides Tagg & Forrest 1930	Myanmar
	Rhododendron glischrum Balf.f. & W.W.Sm. 1916	China (Xizang, Yunnan) India, Myanmar
	Rhododendron habrotrichum Balf.f. & W.W.Sm. 1916	China (Yunnan), Myanmar
	Rhododendron recurvoides Tagg & Forrest 1929-1931 publ. 1932	Myanmar
	Rhododendron spilotum Balf.f. & Farrer 1922	Myanmar
	Rhododendron vesiculiferum Tagg 1930	China (Xizang, Yunnan), Myanmar

=== Grandia ===
Rhododendron subsect. Grandia is a subsection of section Ponticum in Hymenanthes that comprises 15 species of trees with large leaf blades covered with trichomes native to East Asia.

Image	Name	Distribution
	Rhododendron balangense W.P.Fang 1983	China (Sichuan)
	Rhododendron grande Wight 1847	China(Xizang), Bhutan, India (Arunachal Pradesh, Sikkim), Nepal
	Rhododendron kesangiae D.G.Long & Rushforth 1988 publ. 1989	Bhutan
	Rhododendron macabeanum G.Watt ex Balf.f. 1920	China (Xizang), Myanmar
	Rhododendron magnificum Kingdon Ward 1935	China (Xizang)
	Rhododendron montroseanum Davidian 1979	China (Xizang)
	Rhododendron oreogenum L. C. Hu 1992	China (Xizang)
	Rhododendron praestans I. B. Balfour & W. W. Smith 1916	China (Xizang, Yunnan)
	Rhododendron protistum I. B. Balfour & Forrest 1920	China (Xizang, Yunnan), Myanmar
	Rhododendron pudorosum Cowan 1937	China (Xizang)
	Rhododendron sidereum I. B. Balfour 1920	China (Yunnan), Myanmar
	Rhododendron sinogrande I. B. Balfour & W. W. Smith 1916	China (Xizang, Yunnan), Myanmar
	Rhododendron suoilenhense D.F.Chamb., N.T.T.Huong & Rushforth 2020	Vietnam
	Rhododendron watsonii Hemsley & E. H. Wilson 1910	China (Gansu, Sichuan)
	Rhododendron wattii Cowan 1936	India (Assam)

=== Griersoniana ===
Rhododendron subsect. Griersoniana is a subsection of section Ponticum in Hymenanthes that contains a single species of shrub.

Image	Name	Distribution
	Rhododendron griersonianum B. Balfour & Forrest 1919	China (Yunnan), Myanmar

=== Maculifera ===
Rhododendron subsect. Maculifera is a subsection of section Ponticum in Hymenanthes that contains 15 species of shrubs or small trees with tomentose stems and rough bark.

Image	Name	Distribution
	Rhododendron anwheiense E.H.Wilson 1925	China (Anhui)
	Rhododendron longesquamatum C.K.Schneid. 1909	China (Sichuan)
	Rhododendron maculiferum Franch. 1895	China ( Anhui, Gansu, Guangxi, Guizhou, Hubei, Hunan, Jiangxi, Shaanxi, Sichuan, Zhejiang)
	Rhododendron morii Hayata 1911	Taiwan
	Rhododendron ochraceum Rehder & E.H.Wilson 1913	China (Sichuan, Yunnan)
	Rhododendron pachyphyllum W.P.Fang 1983	China (Guangxi, Hunan)
	Rhododendron pachysanthum Hayata 1913	Taiwan
	Rhododendron pachytrichum Franch. 1886	China (Sichuan, Shaanxi)
	Rhododendron pilostylum W.K.Hu 1988	China (Yunnan)
	Rhododendron polytrichum W.P.Fang 1983	China (Guangxi, Hunan)
	Rhododendron pseudochrysanthum Hayata 1908	Taiwan
	Rhododendron sikangense W.P.Fang 1952	China (Sichuan)
	Rhododendron strigillosum Franch. 1886	China (Sichuan, Yunnan)
	Rhododendron subroseum Xiang Chen & Jia Y.Huang 2010	China (Guizhou)
	Rhododendron ziyuanense P.C.Tam 1982	China (Guangxi)

=== Lanata ===
Rhododendron subsect. Lanata contains 6 species of small trees found in east asia

Image	Name	Distribution
	Rhododendron circinnatum Cowan & Kingdon-Ward 1936	China (Xizang)
	Rhododendron lanatoides D.F.Chamb. 1982	China (Xizang)
	Rhododendron lanatum Hook.f. 1851	China (Xizang), Bhutan, India (Sikkim)
	Rhododendron luciferum (Cowan) Cowan 1953	China (Xizang)
	Rhododendron poluninii Davidian 1989	Bhutan
	Rhododendron tsariense Cowan 1937	China (Xizang), Bhutan, India

=== Parishia ===
Rhododendron subsect. Parishia is a subsection of section Ponticum in Hymenanthes that contains 8 species of small trees found in east asia.

Image	Name	Distribution
	Rhododendron elliottii Brandis ex Lace & W.W.Sm. 1906	India, Assam (Manipur, Nagaland)
	Rhododendron facetum Balf.f. & Kingdon-Ward 1917	China (Yunnan), Myanmar, Vietnam
	Rhododendron flavoflorum T.L.Ming 1984	China (Yunnan)
	Rhododendron huidongense T.L.Ming 1981	China (Sichuan)
	Rhododendron kyawii Lace & W.W.Sm. 1914	China (Yunnan), Myanmar
	Rhododendron parishii C.B.Clarke 1882	Myanmar
	Rhododendron schistocalyx Balf.f. & Forrest 1920	China (Yunnan)
	Rhododendron urophyllum W.P.Fang 1983	China (Sichuan)

=== Pontica ===
Rhododendron subsect. Pontica is a subsection of section Ponticum in Hymenanthes consisting of 13 species of shrubs to small trees native to North America, Europe, and East Asia.

Image	Name	Distribution
	Rhododendron aureum Georgi 1775	China (Jilin, Liaoning), Japan, Korea, Mongolia, Russia
	Rhododendron brachycarpum D.Don ex G.Don 1834	Japan and Korea
	Rhododendron catawbiense Michx. 1803	United States (West Virginia south to northern Alabama.)
	Rhododendron caucasicum Pall. 1784	Transcaucasus and Anatolia
	Rhododendron degronianum Carrière	Japan (-Honshu)
	Rhododendron hyperythrum Hayata 1913	Taiwan
	Rhododendron japonoheptamerum Kitam. 1987	Japan
	Rhododendron macrophyllum D.Don ex G.Don	United States (Washington, California and northern Oregon), Canada (British Columbia)
	Rhododendron makinoi Tagg ex Nakai 1834	Japan
	Rhododendron maximum L. 1753	Alabama north to coastal Nova Scotia.
	Rhododendron ponticum L. 1762	Bulgaria, Lebanon-Syria, North Caucasus, Portugal, Spain, Transcaucasus, Turkey
	Rhododendron smirnowii Trautv. ex Regel 1885	Transcaucasus, Turkey
	Rhododendron ungernii Trautv. ex Regel 1885	Transcaucasus, Turkey

=== Selensia ===
Rhododendron subsect. Selensia is a subsection of section Ponticum in Hymenanthes consisting of 8 species of shrubs to small trees with campanulate flowers.

Image	Name	Distribution
	Rhododendron bainbridgeanum Tagg & Forrest 1930	China ( Xizang, Yunnan), Myanmar
	Rhododendron calvescens Balf.f. & Forrest 1919	China ( Xizang, Yunnan)
	Rhododendron dasycladoides Hand.-Mazz. 1936	China ( Sichuan, Yunnan)
	Rhododendron esetulosum Balf.f. & Forrest 1920	China ( Xizang, Yunnan)
	Rhododendron hirtipes Tagg ex Kingdon-Ward 1930	China ( Xizang )
	Rhododendron martinianum Balf.f. & Forrest 1919	China ( Xizang, Yunnan), Myanmar
	Rhododendron selense Franch. 1898	China ( Xizang, Sichuan, Yunnan)
	Rhododendron setiferum Balf.f. & Forrest 1919	China ( Xizang, Yunnan)

=== Taliensia ===
Rhododendron subsect. Taliensia is a subsection of section Ponticum in Hymenanthes consisting of 57 species of shrubs and small trees with their leaves covered with indumentum.

Image	Name	Distribution
	Rhododendron adenogynum Diels 1912	China ( Xizang, Sichuan, Yunnan)
	Rhododendron aganniphum Balf.f. & Kingdon-Ward 1917	China (Qinghai, Sichuan, Xizang, Yunnan)
	Rhododendron alutaceum Balf.f. & W.W.Sm. 1917	China ( Xizang, Sichuan, Yunnan)
	Rhododendron aureodorsale (W.P.Fang ex J.Q.Fu) Y.P.Ma & J.Nielsen 2012	China (Shaanxi)
	Rhododendron balfourianum Diels 1912	China ( Sichuan, Yunnan)
	Rhododendron barkamense D.F.Chamb. 1982	China ( Sichuan )
	Rhododendron beesianum Diels 1912	China ( Xizang, Sichuan, Yunnan), Myanmar
	Rhododendron bhutanense D.G.Long & S.Bowes-Lyon 1989	Bhutan
	Rhododendron bureavii Franch. 1887	China ( Sichuan, Yunnan)
	Rhododendron clementinae Forrest ex W.W.Sm. 1915	China (Shaanxi, Sichuan, Yunnan)
	Rhododendron codonanthum Balf.f. & Forrest 1922	China (Yunnan)
	Rhododendron coeloneurum Diels 1900	China (Guizhou, Sichuan, Yunnan)
	Rhododendron comisteum Balf.f. & Forrest 1919	China ( Xizang, Yunnan)
	Rhododendron dachengense G.Z.Li 2001	China ( Guangxi )
	Rhododendron danbaense L.C.Hu 1986	China ( Sichuan )
	Rhododendron dayiense M.Y.He 1997	China ( Sichuan )
	Rhododendron detersile Franch. 1898	China (Shaanxi, Sichuan)
	Rhododendron dignabile Cowan 1937	China ( Xizang )
	Rhododendron dumicola Tagg & Forrest 1930	China ( Yunnan)
	Rhododendron elegantulum Tagg & Forrest 1927	China ( Sichuan, Yunnan)
	Rhododendron faberi Hemsl. 1889	China ( Sichuan )
	Rhododendron heizhugouense M.Y.He & L.C.Hu 1996	China ( Sichuan )
	Rhododendron lacteum Franch. 1886	China ( Yunnan)
	Rhododendron lulangense L.C.Hu & Tateishi 1992	China ( Xizang )
	Rhododendron mimetes Tagg & Forrest 1927	China ( Sichuan )
	Rhododendron montiganum T.L.Ming 1984	China ( Yunnan)
	Rhododendron nakotiltum Balf.f. & Forrest 1920	China ( Yunnan)
	Rhododendron nhatrangense Dop 1930	Vietnam
	Rhododendron nigroglandulosum Nitz. 1975	China ( Sichuan )
	Rhododendron phaeochrysum Balf.f. & Forrest 1917	China ( Xizang, Sichuan, Yunnan)
	Rhododendron pomense Cowan & Davidian 1953	China ( Xizang )
	Rhododendron potaninii Batalin 1891	China ( Gansu )
	Rhododendron prattii Franch. 1895	China (Sichuan)
	Rhododendron principis Bureau & Franch. 1891	China ( Xizang )
	Rhododendron pronum Tagg & Forrest 1927	China ( Yunnan)
	Rhododendron proteoides Balf.f. & W.W.Sm. 1916	China ( Xizang, Sichuan, Yunnan)
	Rhododendron przewalskii Maxim. 1877	China ( Gansu, Qinghai, W Shaanxi, Sichuan)
	Rhododendron pubicostatum T.L.Ming 1981	China ( Yunnan)
	Rhododendron pugeense L.C.Hu 1992	China (Sichuan)
	Rhododendron punctifolium L.C.Hu 1984	China (Yunnan)
	Rhododendron roxieanum W.W.Sm. ex Forrest 1915	China ( Gansu, Shaanxi, Sichuan, Xizang, Yunnan )
	Rhododendron roxieoides D.F.Chamb. 1982	China (Sichuan)
	Rhododendron rufum Batalin 1891	China ( Gansu, Qinghai, Shaanxi, Sichuan )
	Rhododendron scopulum (G.Z.Li) G.Z.Li 2010	China (Guangxi)
	Rhododendron shanii W.P.Fang 1983	China (Anhui)
	Rhododendron sphaeroblastum Balf.f. & Forrest 1920	China ( Sichuan, Yunnan)
	Rhododendron taliense Franch. 1886	China (Yunnan)
	Rhododendron tianmenshanense C.L.Peng & L.H.Yan 2007	China (Hunan)
	Rhododendron torquescens D.F.Chamb. 2005	China ( Gansu )
	Rhododendron traillianum Forrest & W.W.Sm. 1914	China ( Xizang, Sichuan, Yunnan)
	Rhododendron trichogynum L.C.Hu 1992	China (Sichuan)
	Rhododendron vellereum Hutch. ex Tagg 1930	China (Qinghai, Xizang)
	Rhododendron wasonii Hemsl. & E.H.Wilson 1910	China (Sichuan)
	Rhododendron wightii Hook.f.	China (Xizang), Bhutan, Nepal, Sikkim
	Rhododendron wiltonii Hemsl. & E.H.Wilson 1910	China (Sichuan)
	Rhododendron yaoshanense L.M.Gao & S.D.Zhang 2008	China ( Yunnan)
	Rhododendron zhongdianense L.C.Hu 1984	China ( Yunnan)

=== Thomsonia ===
Rhododendron subsect. Thomsonia is a subsection of section Ponticum in Hymenanthes consisting of 17 species of small trees with reddish flowers and peeling red bark native to East Asia.

Image	Name	Distribution
	Rhododendron bonvalotii Bureau & Franch. 1891	China (Sichuan)
	Rhododendron cerasinum Tagg ex Kingdon-Ward 1930	China (Xizang), Myanmar
	Rhododendron cyanocarpum (Franch.) Franch. ex W.W.Sm. 1914	China (Yunnan)
	Rhododendron eclecteum Balf.f. & Forrest 1920	China (Sichuan, Xizang, Yunnan), Myanmar
	Rhododendron eurysiphon Tagg & Forrest 1930	China (Xizang)
	Rhododendron faucium D.F.Chamb. 1978	China (Xizang)
	Rhododendron hookeri Nutt. 1853	China (Xizang), India
	Rhododendron hylaeum Balf.f. & Farrer 1922	China (Xizang, Yunnan), Myanmar
	Rhododendron meddianum Forrest 1920	China (Yunnan), Myanmar
	Rhododendron megalanthum M.Y.Fang 1988	China (Xizang)
	Rhododendron populare Cowan 1937	China (Xizang)
	Rhododendron ramipilosum T.L.Ming 1984	China (Xizang)
	Rhododendron sherriffii Cowan 1937	China (Xizang)
	Rhododendron stewartianum Diels 1912	China (Xizang, Yunnan), Myanmar
	Rhododendron subansiriense D.F.Chamb. & Pet.A.Cox 1978	Bhutan, India ( Sikkim, Arunachal Pradesh)
	Rhododendron thomsonii Hook.f. 1851	China (Xizang), Bhutan, India (Sikkim), Nepal,
	Rhododendron viscidifolium Davidian 1966	China (Xizang)

=== Venatora ===
Image	Name	Distribution
	Rhododendron venator Tagg ex L. Rothschild 1933	China (Xizang)

=== Williamsiana ===
Rhododendron subsect. Williamsiana is a subsection of section Ponticum in Hymenanthes consisting of 2 species

Image	Name	Distribution
	Rhododendron venator Rehder & E.H.Wilson 1913	China (Guizhou, Sichuan, Xizang, Yunnan)
	Rhododendron leishanicum W.P.Fang & X.S.Zhang 1983	China (Guizhou)

== Pentanthera ==
Rhododendron sect. Pentanthera is a section of subgenus Hymenanthes in the genus Rhododendron. It comprises 15-16 species of deciduous shrubs native to temperate regions of the Northern Hemisphere.

It includes two subsections:

- Pentathera
- Sinensia

=== Pentanthera ===
Species include:

Image	Name	Distribution
	Rhododendron alabamense Alfred Rehder, 1921 (Alabama azalea)	United States (Alabama, Florida, Georgia, Mississippi, North Carolina, South Carolina, Tennessee)
	Rhododendron arborescens John Torrey, 1824	United States (West Virginia, Pennsylvania, Tennessee, North Carolina, Georgia and Alabama.)
	Rhododendron atlanticum Alfred Rehder, 1921	United States (New Jersey south to Georgia.)
	Rhododendron austrinum (Small) Rehder 1917	United States (Alabama, Florida, Georgia, and Mississippi)
	Rhododendron calendulaceum John Torrey, 1824	United States (southern Pennsylvania and Ohio to northern Georgia.)
	Rhododendron canadense (L.) Torr.	Canada in Newfoundland and extends into eastern Ontario and the United States from New York, New Jersey, and at high altitudes in the Appalachian Mountains further south to Pennsylvania.
	Rhododendron canescens (Michx.) Sweet 1889	United States(Alabama, Arkansas, Delaware, Florida, Georgia, Kentucky, Louisiana, Maryland, Mississippi, North Carolina, Oklahoma, Pennsylvania, South Carolina, Tennessee, Texas, Virginia )
	Rhododendron colemanii Ronald F. Miller, 2008	United States(Alabama and western Georgia)
	Rhododendron cumberlandense Emma Lucy Braun, 1941	United States (Kentucky, Tennessee, Georgia, Alabama, and North Carolina.)
	Rhododendron eastmanii Kathleen Anne Kron, 1999	United States (South Carolina)
	Rhododendron flammeum (Michx.) Sarg. 1917	United States(Georgia and South Carolina)
	Rhododendron luteum Sweet 1911 (yellow azalea, honeysuckle azalea)	southern Russia; and in Asia
	Rhododendron occidentale Torr. & A.Gray 1876	United States(Oregon, California)
	Rhododendron periclymenoides (Michx.) Shinners 1962 (pink azalea, pinxterbloom azalea, pinxter flower)	United States(southern New York south to Georgia)
	Rhododendron prinophyllum (Small) Millais 1917 (rose azalea, roseshell azalea)	Eastern United States
	Rhododendron prunifolium (Small) Millais 1917	United States( Georgia, Alabama )
	Rhododendron viscosum (L.) Torr. 1824 (Swamp azalea)	Eastern United States

=== Sinensia ===
Species include:

Image	Name	Distribution
	Rhododendron molle (Blume) G.Don 1834	S. China
	Rhododendron japonicum (A.Gray) Suringar, 1908	Japan (Honshu, Shikoku, N. Kyushu).

The section is closely related to sect. Rhodora, differing from it in the flower corolla having five fully developed lobes, whereas sect. Rhodora has the upper three lobes joined into a single three-lipped lobe.

==== Cultivation ====
Most (but not all) of the cultivated azaleas belong to species in this section, and hybrids derived from them.

== Bibliography ==
- Huxley, A., ed. (1992). New RHS Dictionary of Gardening. Macmillan.
- Craven, L.A.; Goetsch, L.A.; Hall, B.D.; Brown, G.K. (2008). "Classification of the Vireya group of Rhododendron (Ericaceae)". Blumea - Biodiversity, Evolution and Biogeography of Plants. 53 (2): 435. Bibcode:2008Blume..53..435C. doi:10.3767/000651908X608070.
- Germplasm Resources Information Network: Rhododendron sect. Pentanthera
