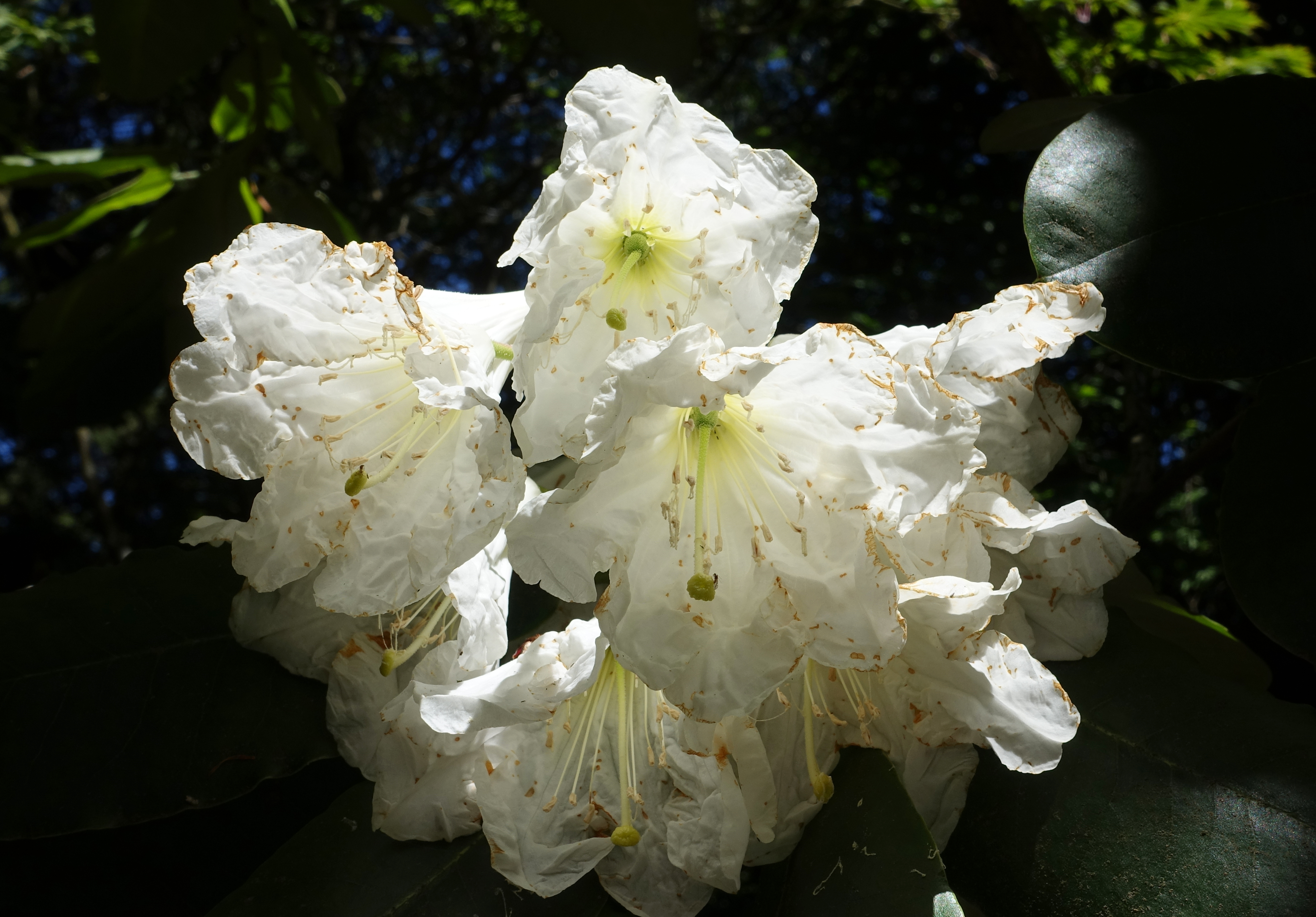

Scientific classification
- Kingdom: Plantae
- Clade: Tracheophytes
- Clade: Angiosperms
- Clade: Eudicots
- Clade: Asterids
- Order: Ericales
- Family: Ericaceae
- Genus: Rhododendron
- Subgenus: Rhododendron subg. Hymenanthes
- Section: Rhododendron sect. Ponticum
- Species: R. hemsleyanum

Binomial name
- Rhododendron hemsleyanum E.H.Wilson

= Rhododendron hemsleyanum =

Species of plant

Rhododendron hemsleyanum is a rhododendron species native to Mount Emei in Sichuan, China, where it grows at altitudes of 1,200–1,500 m (3,900–4,900 ft). It is a shrub or small tree that grows to 2–9 m (6.6–29.5 ft) in height, with leathery leaves that are oblong to oblong-ovate, and 9–21 cm (3.5–8.3 in) long by 4.6–10.5 cm (1.8–4.1 in) wide. Its flowers are fragrant and white. It is placed in section Ponticum.
