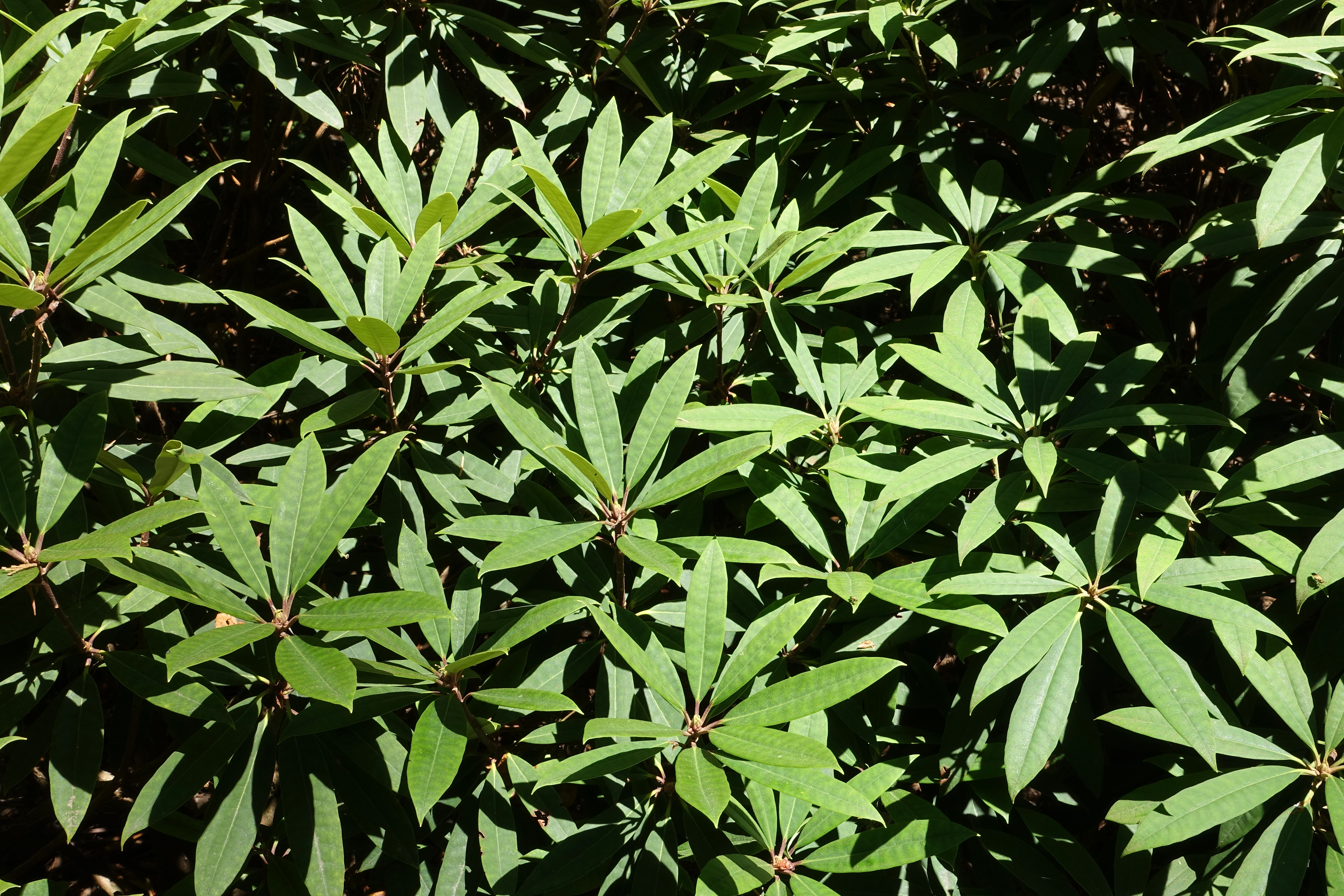

Scientific classification
- Kingdom: Plantae
- Clade: Tracheophytes
- Clade: Angiosperms
- Clade: Eudicots
- Clade: Asterids
- Order: Ericales
- Family: Ericaceae
- Genus: Rhododendron
- Subgenus: Rhododendron subg. Hymenanthes
- Section: Rhododendron sect. Ponticum
- Species: R. longipes

Binomial name
- Rhododendron longipes Rehder & E.H.Wilson

= Rhododendron longipes =

Species of plant

Rhododendron longipes is a rhododendron species native to Chongqing, eastern Guizhou, southwestern Sichuan, and northeastern Yunnan in China, where it grows at altitudes of 1,700–2,500 m (5,600–8,200 ft). It is a shrub or small tree that grows to 2–4 m (6.6–13.1 ft)in height, with leathery leaves that are elliptic or elliptic-lanceolate, and 5–13 cm (2.0–5.1 in) long by 1.5–3.5 cm (0.6–1.4 in) wide. Its flowers are rose-colored with dark red spots inside. It is placed in section Ponticum.
