= Rhododendron subansiriense =

Conservation status
- Vulnerable (IUCN 2.3)

Scientific classification
- Kingdom: Plantae
- Clade: Tracheophytes
- Clade: Angiosperms
- Clade: Eudicots
- Clade: Asterids
- Order: Ericales
- Family: Ericaceae
- Genus: Rhododendron
- Species: R. subansiriense

Binomial name
- Rhododendron subansiriense D.F.Chamb. & Pet.A.Cox.

Species of plant

Rhododendron subansiriense is a species of flowering plant in the family Ericaceae, endemic to the Subansiri district (Note: The citation says simply "Subansiri district". It is unclear if this refers to one or both of Lower Subansiri district and Upper Subansiri district (which do not have a common border) or more generally to the area around the Subansiri River.) of northeastern India. Growing to 14 m (46 ft) in the wild, it has dense trusses of red flowers spotted with purple.

It is rarely found in cultivation in temperate zones, as it is susceptible to late frosts.
