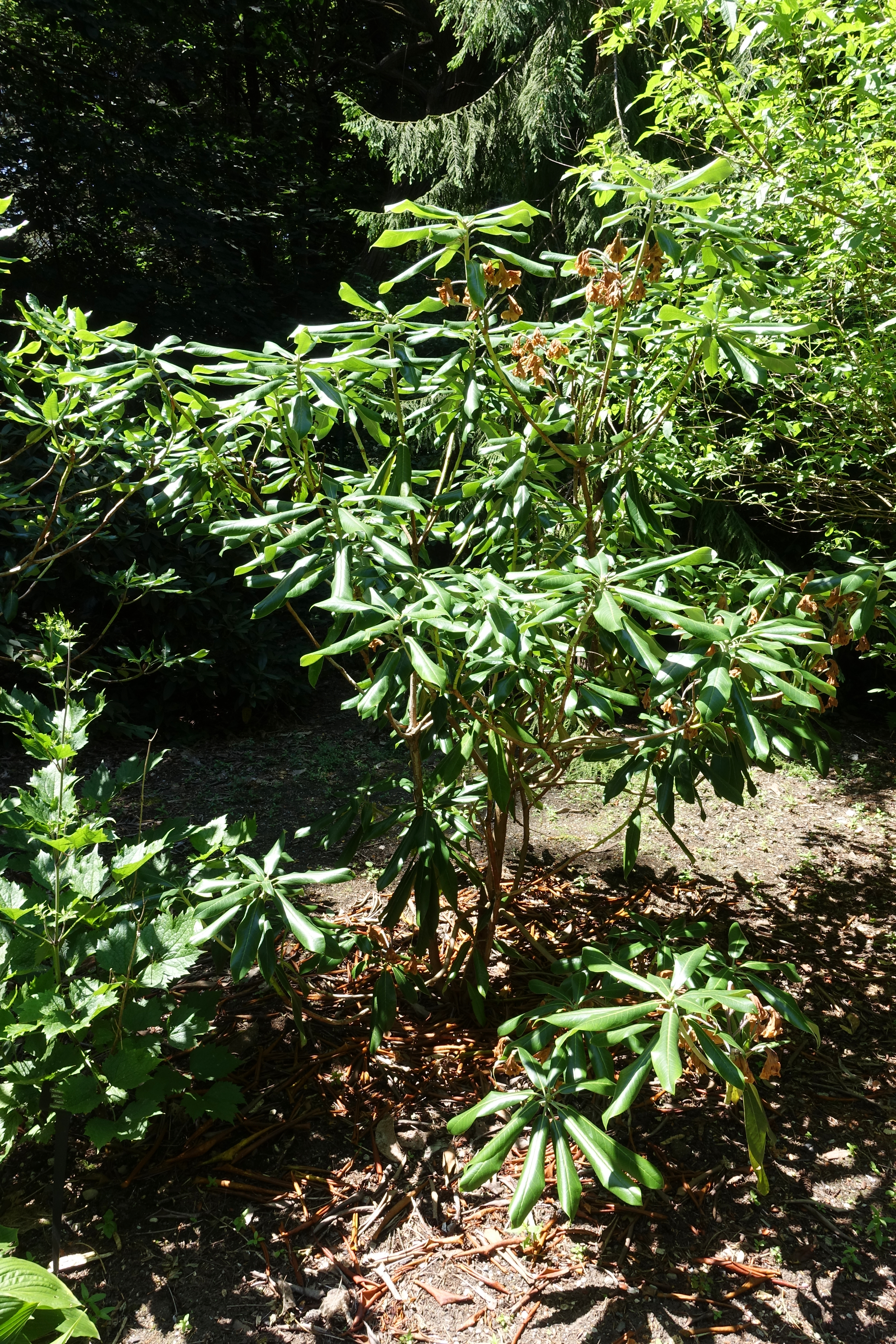

Scientific classification
- Kingdom: Plantae
- Clade: Tracheophytes
- Clade: Angiosperms
- Clade: Eudicots
- Clade: Asterids
- Order: Ericales
- Family: Ericaceae
- Genus: Rhododendron
- Subgenus: Rhododendron subg. Hymenanthes
- Section: Rhododendron sect. Ponticum
- Species: R. maoerense

Binomial name
- Rhododendron maoerense W.P.Fang & G.Z.Li

= Rhododendron maoerense =

Species of plant

Rhododendron maoerense is a rhododendron species native to northeastern Guangxi, China, where it grows at altitudes of 1,800–1,900 m (5,900–6,200 ft). It is a tree that typically grows to 8–12 m (26–39 ft) in height, with leaves that are oblanceolate, rarely obovate, and 14–16 cm (5.5–6.3 in) long by 4–5 cm (1.6–2.0 in) wide. Its flowers are white. It is placed in section Ponticum.
