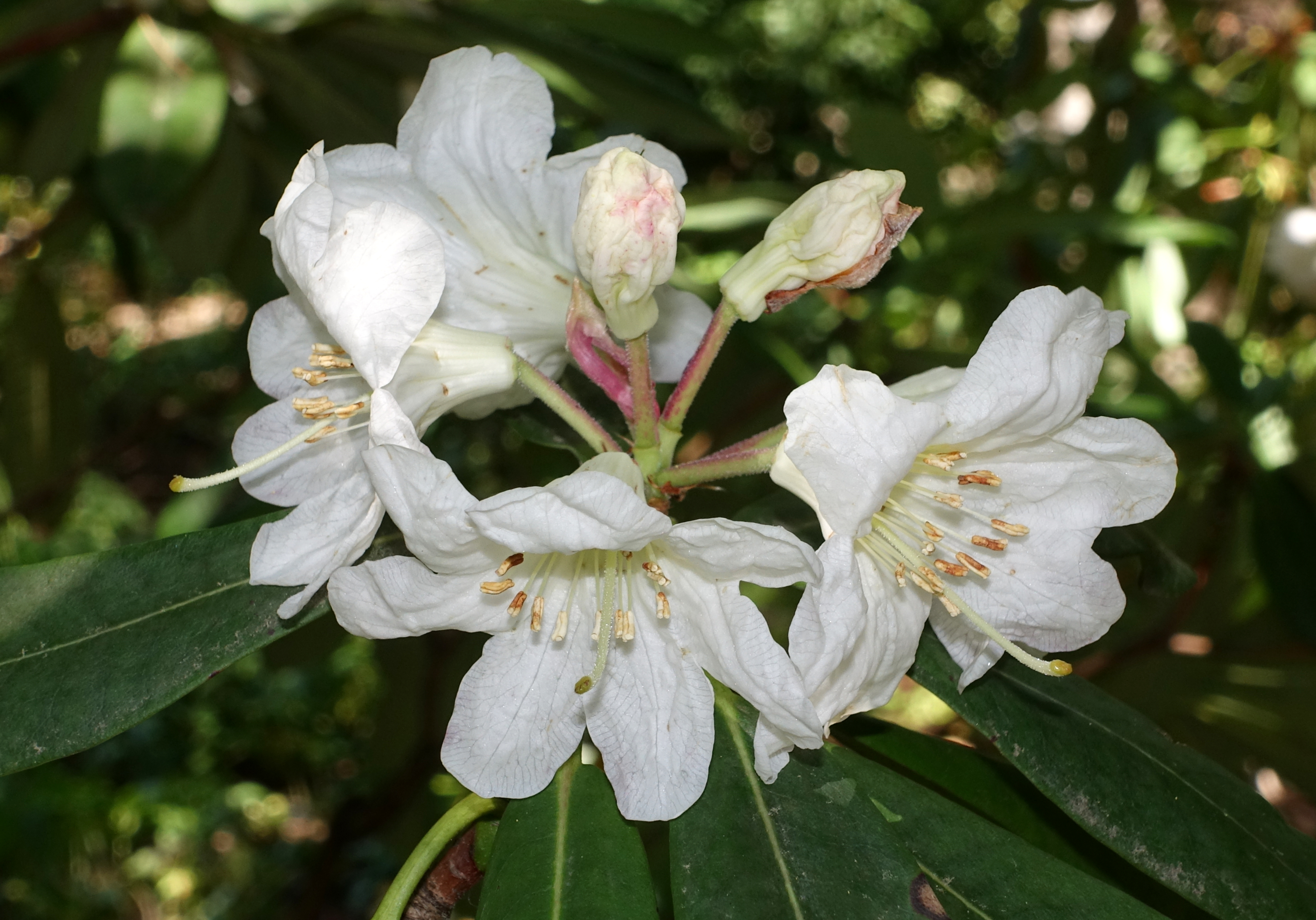

Scientific classification
- Kingdom: Plantae
- Clade: Tracheophytes
- Clade: Angiosperms
- Clade: Eudicots
- Clade: Asterids
- Order: Ericales
- Family: Ericaceae
- Genus: Rhododendron
- Species: R. vernicosum

Binomial name
- Rhododendron vernicosum Franch.

= Rhododendron vernicosum =

Species of plant

Rhododendron vernicosum (亮叶杜鹃) is a rhododendron species native to western Sichuan, southeastern Xizang, and western Yunnan, China, where it grows at altitudes of 2,600–4,300 m (8,500–14,100 ft). It is an evergreen shrub typically growing to 1–5 m (3.3–16.4 ft) in height, with leathery leaves that are oblong-ovate to oblong-elliptic, and 5–12.5 × 2.3–4.8 cm in size. The flowers are somewhat fragrant, and pale pink or white.

== Synonyms ==
- Rhododendron adoxum Balf.f. & Forrest
- Rhododendron araliiforme Balf.f. & Forrest
- Rhododendron euanthum Balf.f. & W.W.Sm.
- Rhododendron hexamerum Hand.-Mazz.
- Rhododendron rhantum Balf.f. & W.W.Sm.
- Rhododendron sheltoniae Hemsl. & E.H. Wilson
