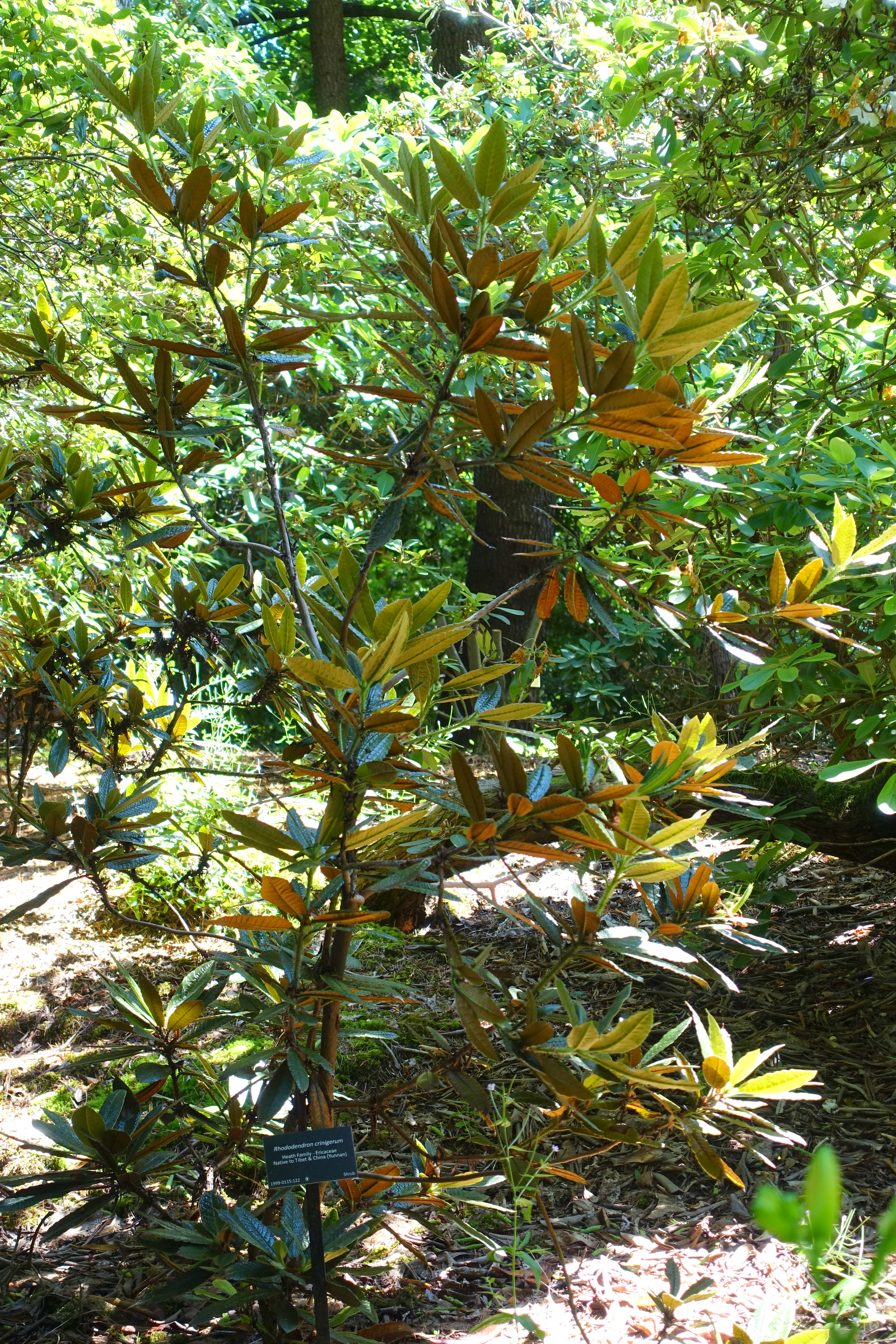

Scientific classification
- Kingdom: Plantae
- Clade: Tracheophytes
- Clade: Angiosperms
- Clade: Eudicots
- Clade: Asterids
- Order: Ericales
- Family: Ericaceae
- Genus: Rhododendron
- Species: R. crinigerum

Binomial name
- Rhododendron crinigerum Franch.

Synonyms
- Rhododendron crinigerum var. crinigerum; Rhododendron ixeuticum Balf. f. & W.W. Sm.

= Rhododendron crinigerum =

Species of flowering bush

Rhododendron crinigerum (长粗毛杜鹃) is a rhododendron species native to northwestern Sichuan, southeastern Xizang, and northwestern Yunnan, China, where it grows at altitudes of 2,200–4,200 m (7,200–13,800 ft). It is a shrub that typically grows to 1–6 m (3.3–19.7 ft) in height, with leathery leaves that are ovate to lanceolate or oblanceolate, and 9–20 × 1.5–3 cm in size. Flowers are white to pink, with purple flecks and basal blotch.
