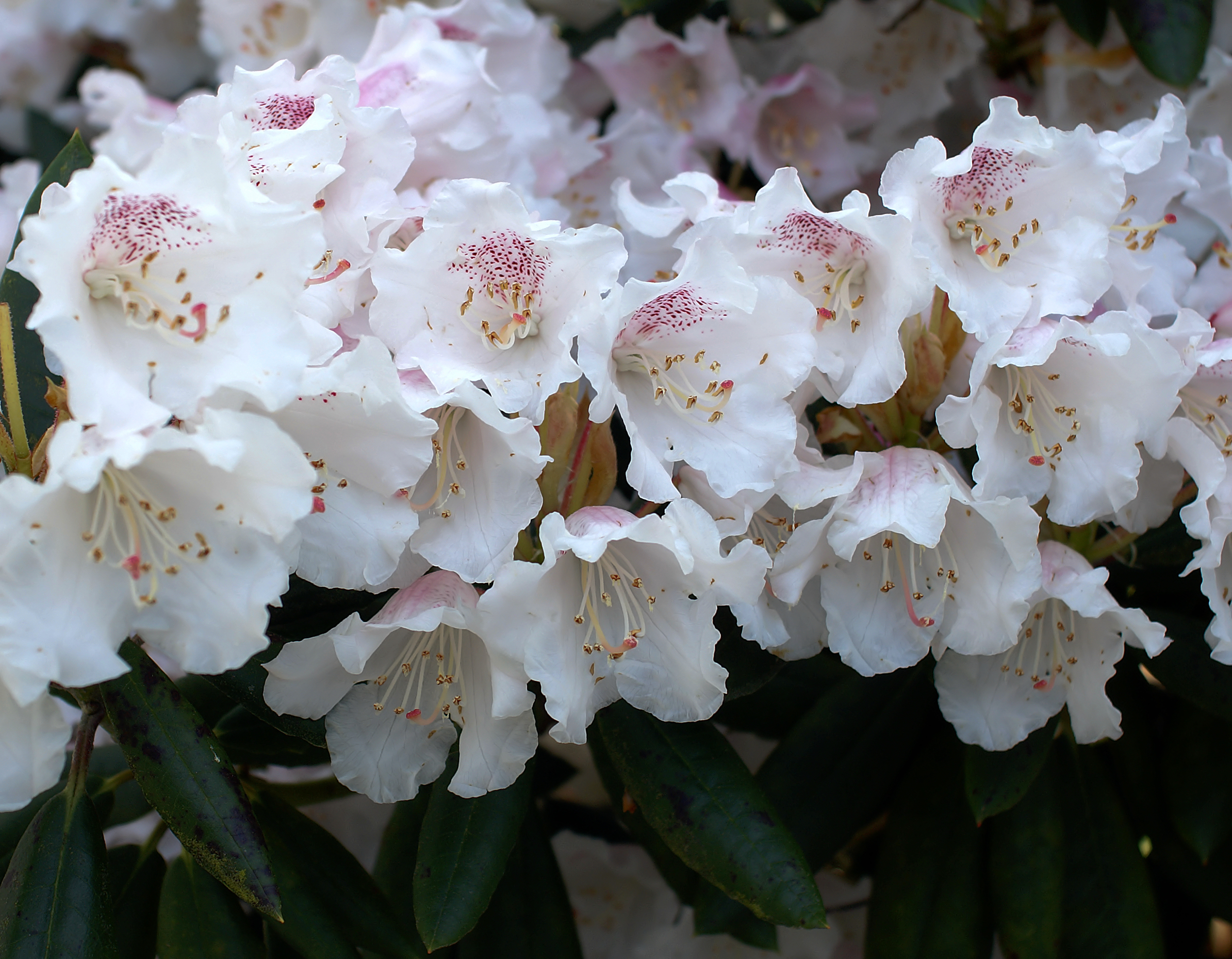
- R. wardii var. puralbum

Scientific classification
- Kingdom: Plantae
- Clade: Tracheophytes
- Clade: Angiosperms
- Clade: Eudicots
- Clade: Asterids
- Order: Ericales
- Family: Ericaceae
- Genus: Rhododendron
- Species: R. wardii

Binomial name
- Rhododendron wardii W.W.Sm.

= Rhododendron wardii =

Species of plant

Rhododendron wardii (黄杯杜鹃) is a rhododendron species native to southwestern Sichuan, southeastern Xizang, and northwestern Yunnan in China, where it grows at altitudes of 3,000–4,600 m (9,800–15,100 ft). This evergreen shrub grows to 3 m (9.8 ft) in height, with leathery leaves that are narrowly ovate to oblong-elliptic or broadly ovate-elliptic, 5–8 by 3–4.5 cm in size. The flowers are yellow or white.

== Synonyms ==
- Rhododendron astrocalyx Balf.f. & Forrest
- Rhododendron croceum Balf.f. & W.W.Sm.
- Rhododendron gloeblastum Balf.f. & Forrest
- Rhododendron litiense Balf.f. & Forrest
- Rhododendron oresterum Balf.f. & Forrest
- Rhododendron prasinocalyx Balf.f. & Forrest
