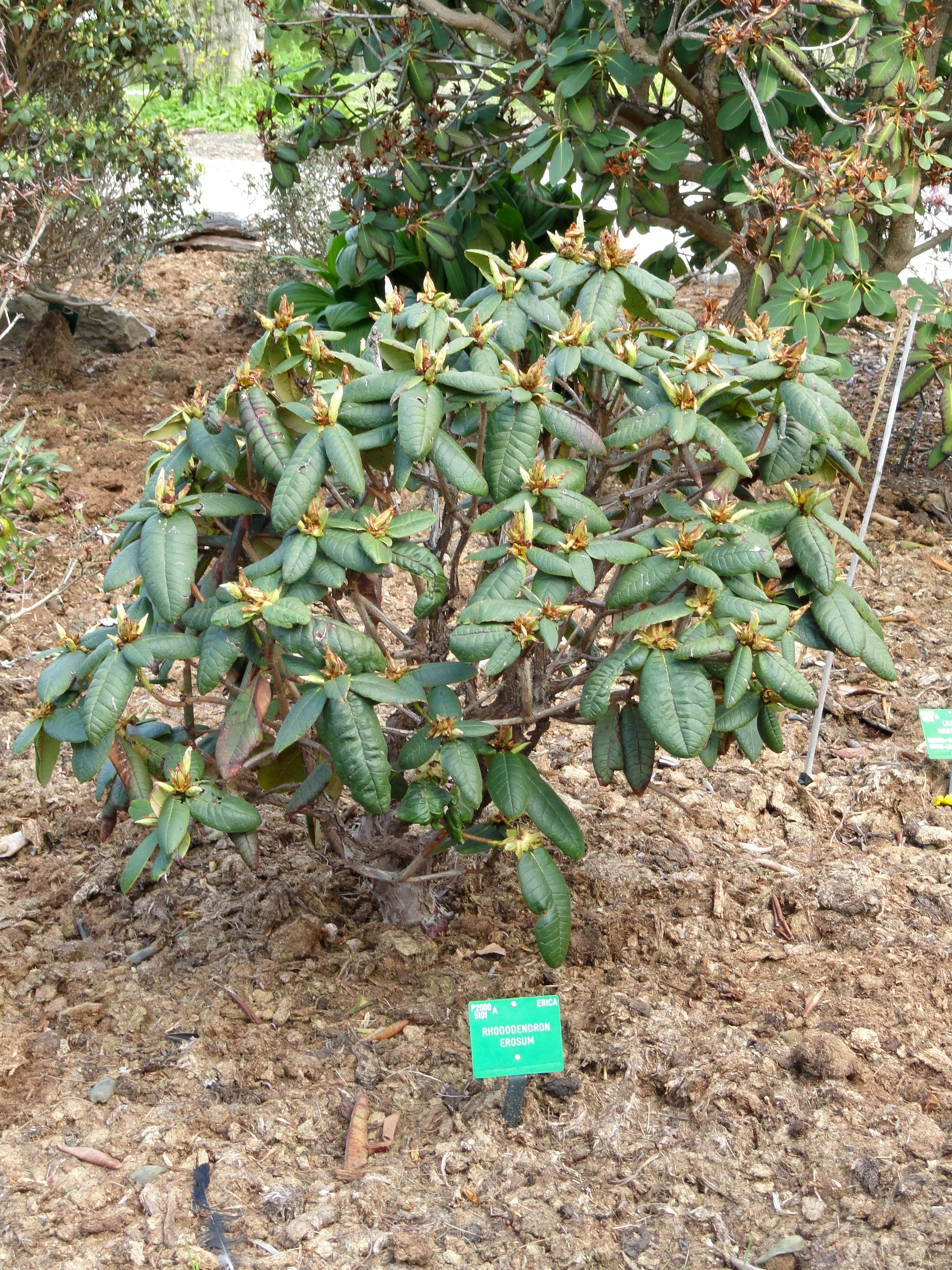

Scientific classification
- Kingdom: Plantae
- Clade: Tracheophytes
- Clade: Angiosperms
- Clade: Eudicots
- Clade: Asterids
- Order: Ericales
- Family: Ericaceae
- Genus: Rhododendron
- Species: R. erosum

Binomial name
- Rhododendron erosum Cowan

= Rhododendron erosum =

Species of plant

Rhododendron erosum (啮蚀杜鹃) is a species of flowering plant in the family Ericaceae, native to eastern Bhutan, southern Tibet, and southern Xizang, China, where it grows at altitudes of 3,000–3,700 m (9,800–12,100 ft). It is a hardy evergreen shrub or small tree that grows to 4.5–6 m (15–20 ft) in height, with leathery leaves that are elliptic to obovate-oblong, 8–10.5 by 3.7–4.5 cm in size. The blood-red flowers are borne in a tight truss, in April and May.
