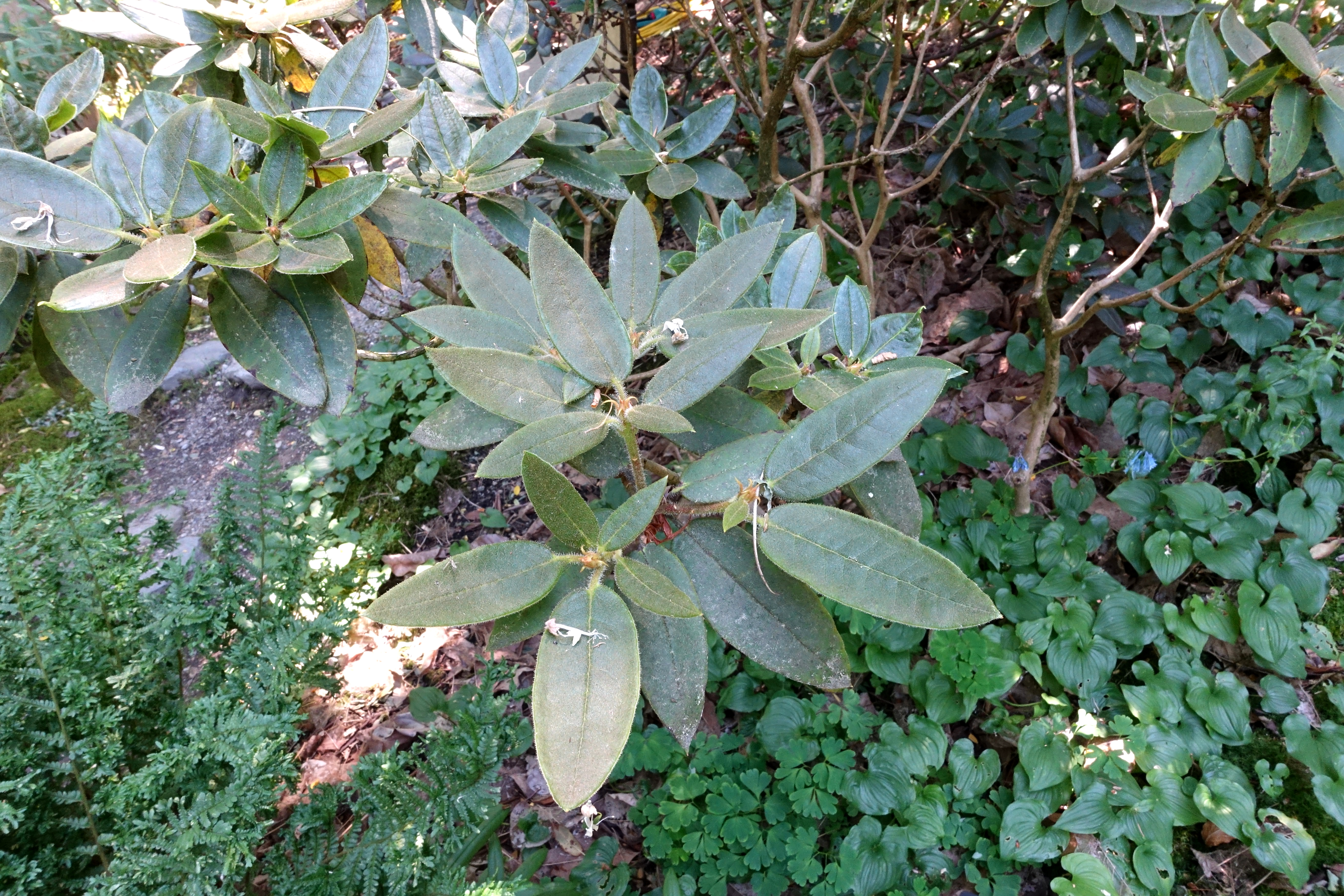

Scientific classification
- Kingdom: Plantae
- Clade: Tracheophytes
- Clade: Angiosperms
- Clade: Eudicots
- Clade: Asterids
- Order: Ericales
- Family: Ericaceae
- Genus: Rhododendron
- Species: R. adenosum

Binomial name
- Rhododendron adenosum (Cowan & Davidian) Davidian
- Rhododendron adenosum is endemic to China

Synonyms
- Rhododendron glischrum var. adenosum Cowan & Davidian; Rhododendron kuluense D.F.Chamb.

= Rhododendron adenosum =

Species of shrub

Rhododendron adenosum (枯鲁杜鹃) is a rhododendron species native to southwestern Sichuan, China, where it grows at altitudes of 3300–3600 meters. It is a shrub that typically grows to 4 meters in height, with leaves that are ovate to lanceolate or elliptic, and 7–10.5 × 2.4–3.4 cm in size. Flowers are pale pink with purple flecks.

== Conservation ==
It was believed to be extinct in the wild, but it has been rediscovered in 2020. Only one individual is known to exist in the wild, and therefore it should be categorised as Critically Endangered according to the IUCN Red List criteria. As of August 2023, it is still listed as extinct by Plants of the World Online of the Royal Botanic Gardens, Kew.
