= Subansiri =

Subansiri may refer to:

- Subansiri Lower Dam, India
- Subansiri River, in India and Tibet
- Lower Subansiri district, Arunachal Pradesh, India
- Upper Subansiri district, Arunachal Pradesh, India
