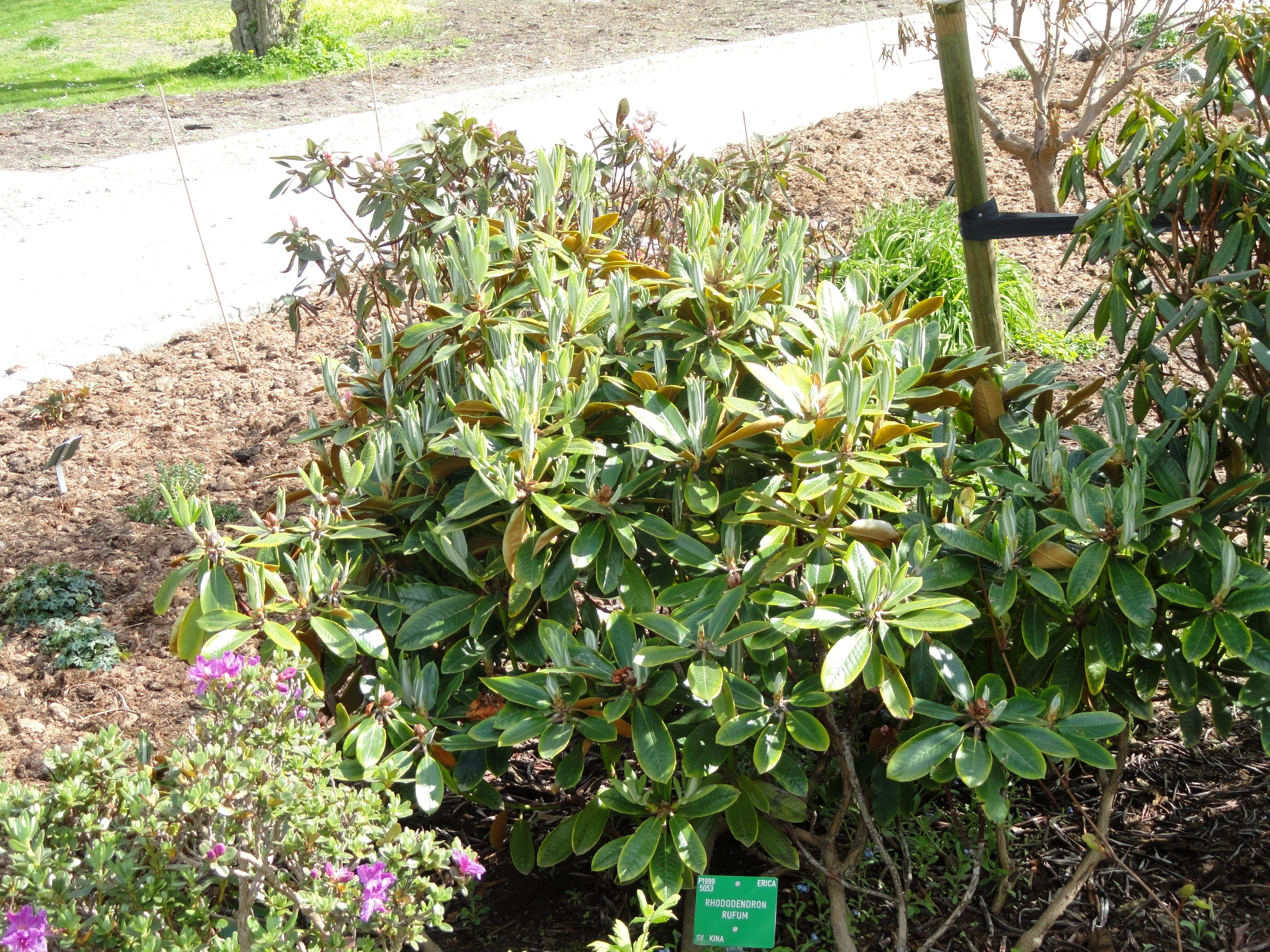

Scientific classification
- Kingdom: Plantae
- Clade: Tracheophytes
- Clade: Angiosperms
- Clade: Eudicots
- Clade: Asterids
- Order: Ericales
- Family: Ericaceae
- Genus: Rhododendron
- Species: R. rufum

Binomial name
- Rhododendron rufum Batalin

= Rhododendron rufum =

Species of plant

Rhododendron rufum (黄毛杜鹃) is a rhododendron species native to southwestern China, where it grows at altitudes of 2,300–3,800 m (7,500–12,500 ft). It is an evergreen shrub or small tree that grows to 1.5–8 m in height, with leathery leaves that are elliptic to oblong-ovate, 6.5–11 by 3–5 cm in size. The flowers are white to pink with crimson spots.

== Synonyms ==
- Rhododendron weldianum Rehder & E.H. Wilson
