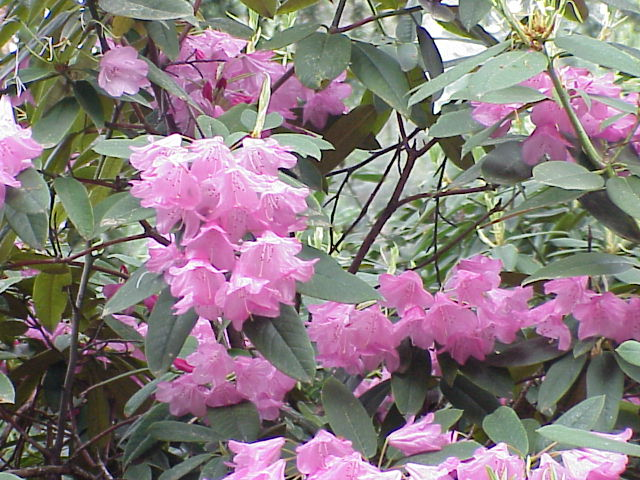

Scientific classification
- Kingdom: Plantae
- Clade: Tracheophytes
- Clade: Angiosperms
- Clade: Eudicots
- Clade: Asterids
- Order: Ericales
- Family: Ericaceae
- Genus: Rhododendron
- Species: R. adenogynum

Binomial name
- Rhododendron adenogynum Diels

Synonyms
- Rhododendron adenophorum Balf. f. & W.W. Sm.

= Rhododendron adenogynum =

Species of flowering plant

Rhododendron adenogynum (simplified Chinese: 腺房杜鹃; traditional Chinese: 腺房杜鵑; pinyin: xiànfáng dùjuān) is a species of flowering plant in the heath family Ericaceae, native to southwest Sichuan, southeast Xizang, and northwest Yunnan in China, where it grows at altitudes of 3,200–4,200 m (10,500–13,800 ft). This evergreen shrub grows to 1–2 m (3.3–6.6 ft) in height, with leathery leaves that are lanceolate to oblong-lanceolate, 6–12 by 2–4 cm in size. The flowers are white to pink, with crimson spots.

Though hardy, it is rarely seen in cultivation outside of specialist collections.
