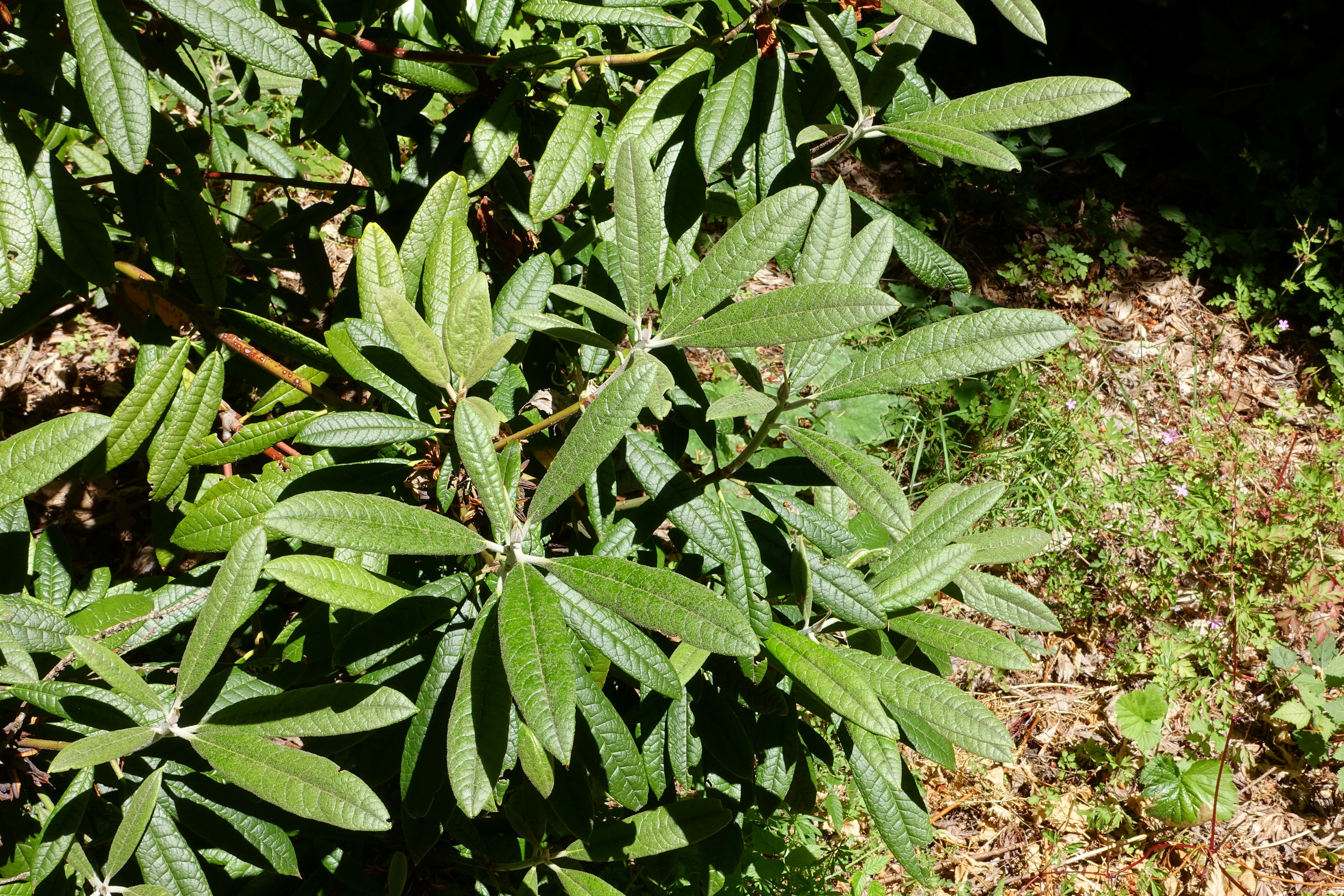

Scientific classification
- Kingdom: Plantae
- Clade: Tracheophytes
- Clade: Angiosperms
- Clade: Eudicots
- Clade: Asterids
- Order: Ericales
- Family: Ericaceae
- Genus: Rhododendron
- Species: R. floribundum

Binomial name
- Rhododendron floribundum Franch.

= Rhododendron floribundum =

Species of plant

Rhododendron floribundum (繁花杜鹃) is a rhododendron species native to northwestern Guizhou, southwestern Sichuan, and northeastern Yunnan in China, where it grows at altitudes of 1,400–2,700 m (4,600–8,900 ft). It is an evergreen shrub that grows to 2–10 m (6.6–32.8 ft) in height, with leathery leaves that are elliptic-lanceolate or oblanceolate, and 8–13 × 1.8–3.8 cm in size. The flowers are magenta-rose with crimson flecks and blotch at base.
