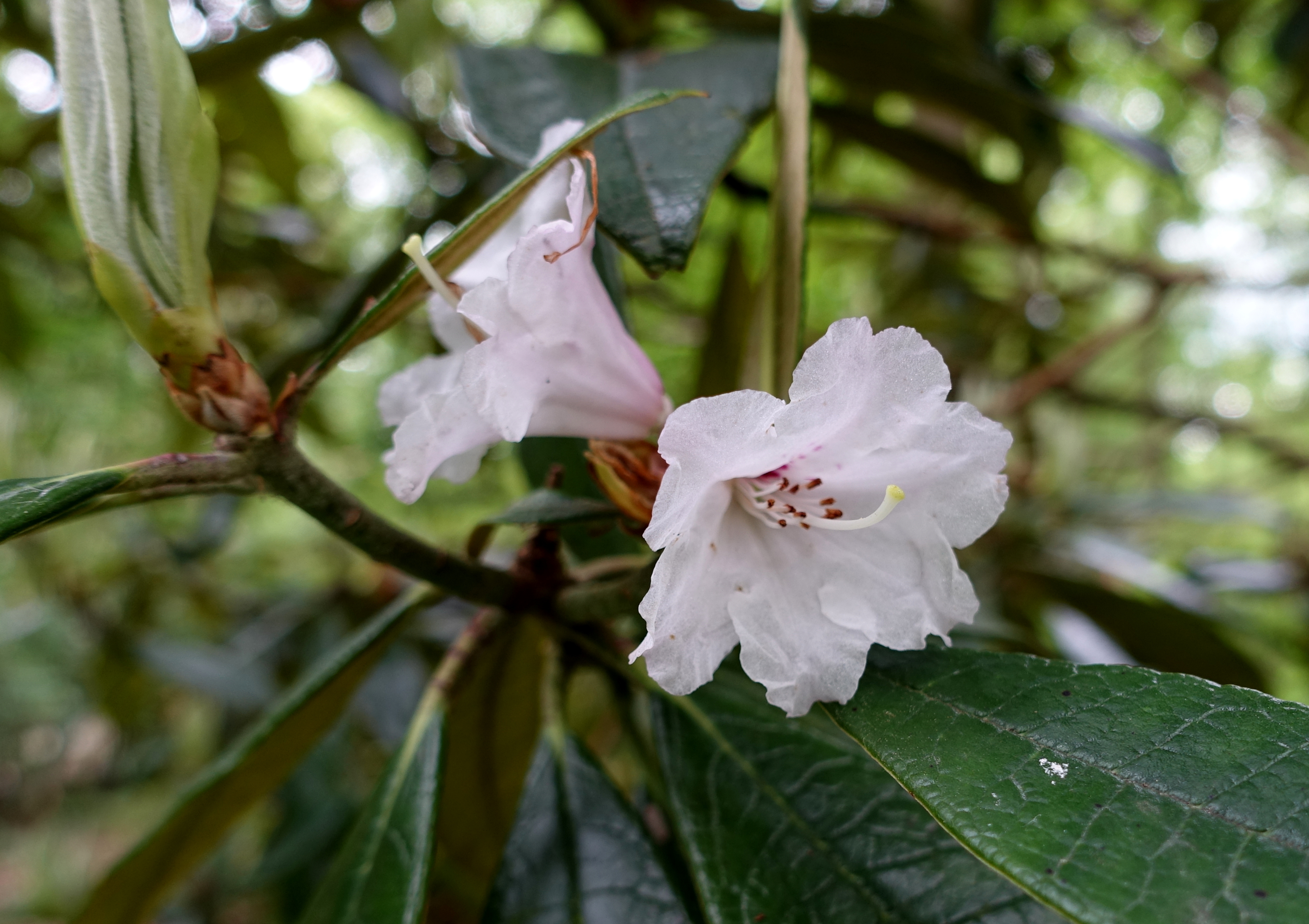

Scientific classification
- Kingdom: Plantae
- Clade: Tracheophytes
- Clade: Angiosperms
- Clade: Eudicots
- Clade: Asterids
- Order: Ericales
- Family: Ericaceae
- Genus: Rhododendron
- Species: R. denudatum

Binomial name
- Rhododendron denudatum H.Lév.

Synonyms
- Rhododendron xanthoneuron H.Lév.

= Rhododendron denudatum =

Species of plant

Rhododendron denudatum (皱叶杜鹃) is a rhododendron species native to northwestern Guizhou, southwestern Sichuan, and eastern Yunnan in China, where it grows at altitudes of 2,000–3,300 m (6,600–10,800 ft). It is a shrub or small tree that grows to 3–6 meters in height, with leathery leaves that are elliptic-lanceolate to ovate-lanceolate, and 10–16 × 2.5–5 cm in size. Flowers are rose-colored with deep crimson flecks.
