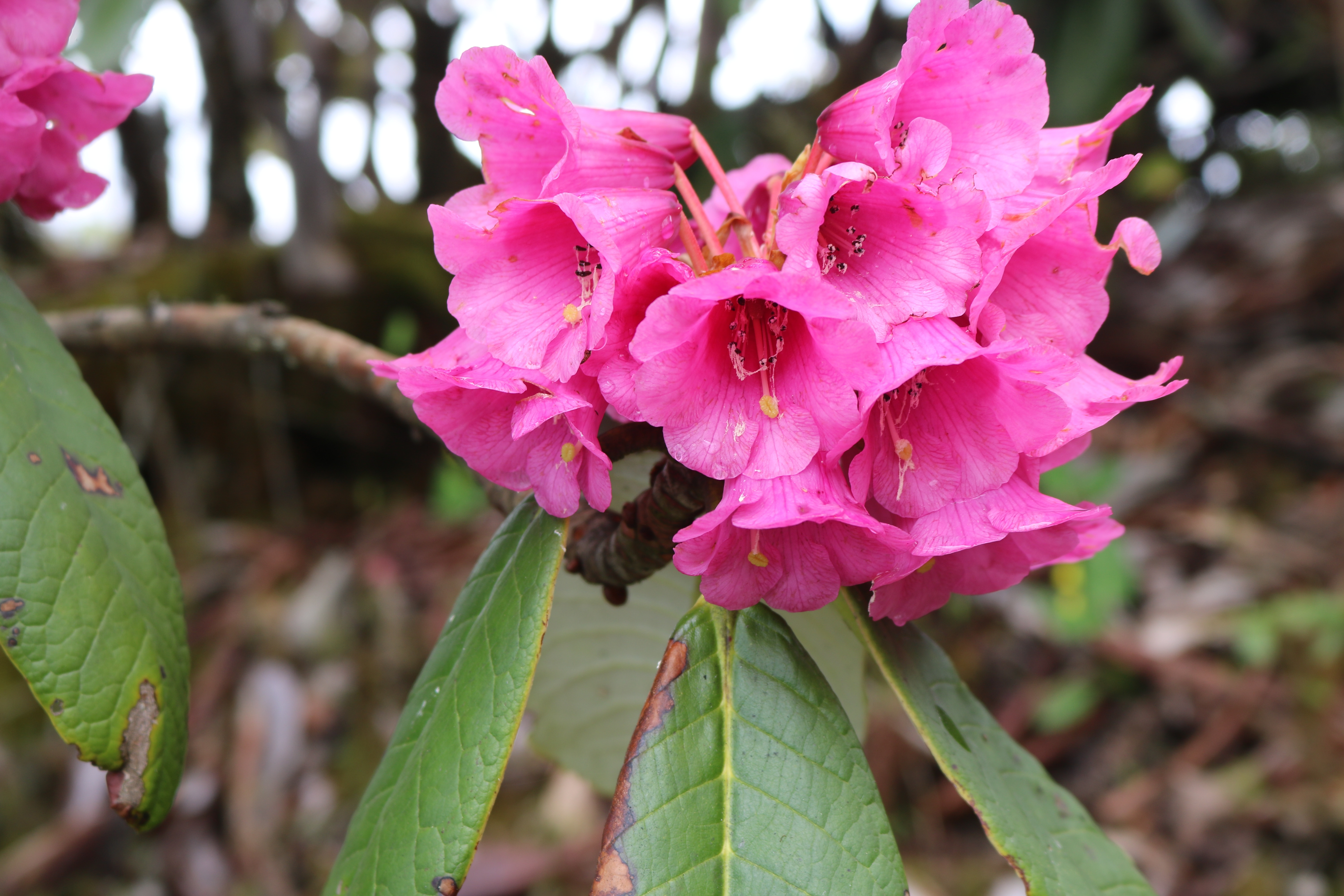
- Rhododendron kesangiae from Pele La Pass where the holotype was collected

Conservation status
- Least Concern (IUCN 3.1)

Scientific classification
- Kingdom: Plantae
- Clade: Tracheophytes
- Clade: Angiosperms
- Clade: Eudicots
- Clade: Asterids
- Order: Ericales
- Family: Ericaceae
- Genus: Rhododendron
- Species: R. kesangiae

Binomial name
- Rhododendron kesangiae D.G. Long & Rushforth

Varieties
- Rhododendron kesangiae var. album

= Rhododendron kesangiae =

Species of flowering bush

Rhododendron kesangiae is a rhododendron species endemic to Bhutan, where it grows at altitudes of 2,890–3,450 m (9,480–11,320 ft) in the fir and hemlock forests. It is called Tala (ཏ་ལ) in Dzongkha. It is a large shrub or tree that typically grows to 15 m (49 ft) in height, with leaves that are broadly elliptic to almost obovate, and 20–30 cm (7.9–11.8 in) long by 10–16 cm (3.9–6.3 in) broad. The flowers are rose pink, fading to purple.

== Etymology ==
The species name kesangiae was given in honour to the Royal Grandmother, Ashi Kesang Choden (born 1930) Wangchuck of Bhutan.

== Flowering ==
Rhododendron kesangiae flowers from April to May.

== Lower taxa ==
- Rhododendron kesangiae var. album P. Namgyel & D.G. Long
- Rhododendron kesangiae var. kesangiae
