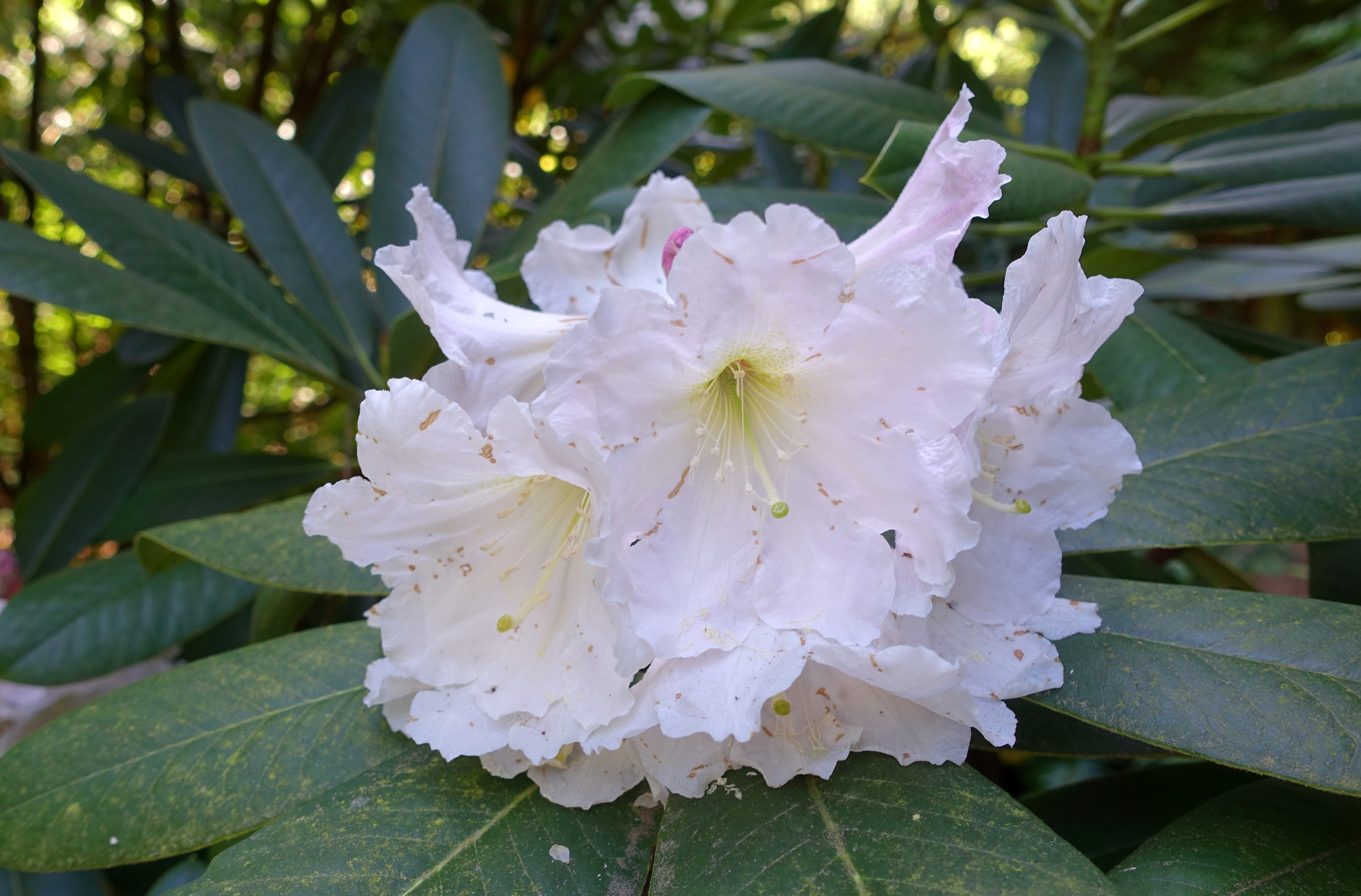

Scientific classification
- Kingdom: Plantae
- Clade: Tracheophytes
- Clade: Angiosperms
- Clade: Eudicots
- Clade: Asterids
- Order: Ericales
- Family: Ericaceae
- Genus: Rhododendron
- Species: R. glanduliferum

Binomial name
- Rhododendron glanduliferum Franch.

= Rhododendron glanduliferum =

Species of plant

Rhododendron glanduliferum (大果杜鹃) is a rhododendron species native to northeastern Yunnan, China, where it grows at altitudes of 2,300–2,400 m (7,500–7,900 ft). It is an evergreen shrub that typically grows to 4 m (13 ft) in height, with leathery leaves that are oblong-lanceolate to oblanceolate, and 10–19 × 3.8–4.5 cm in size. The flowers are white.
