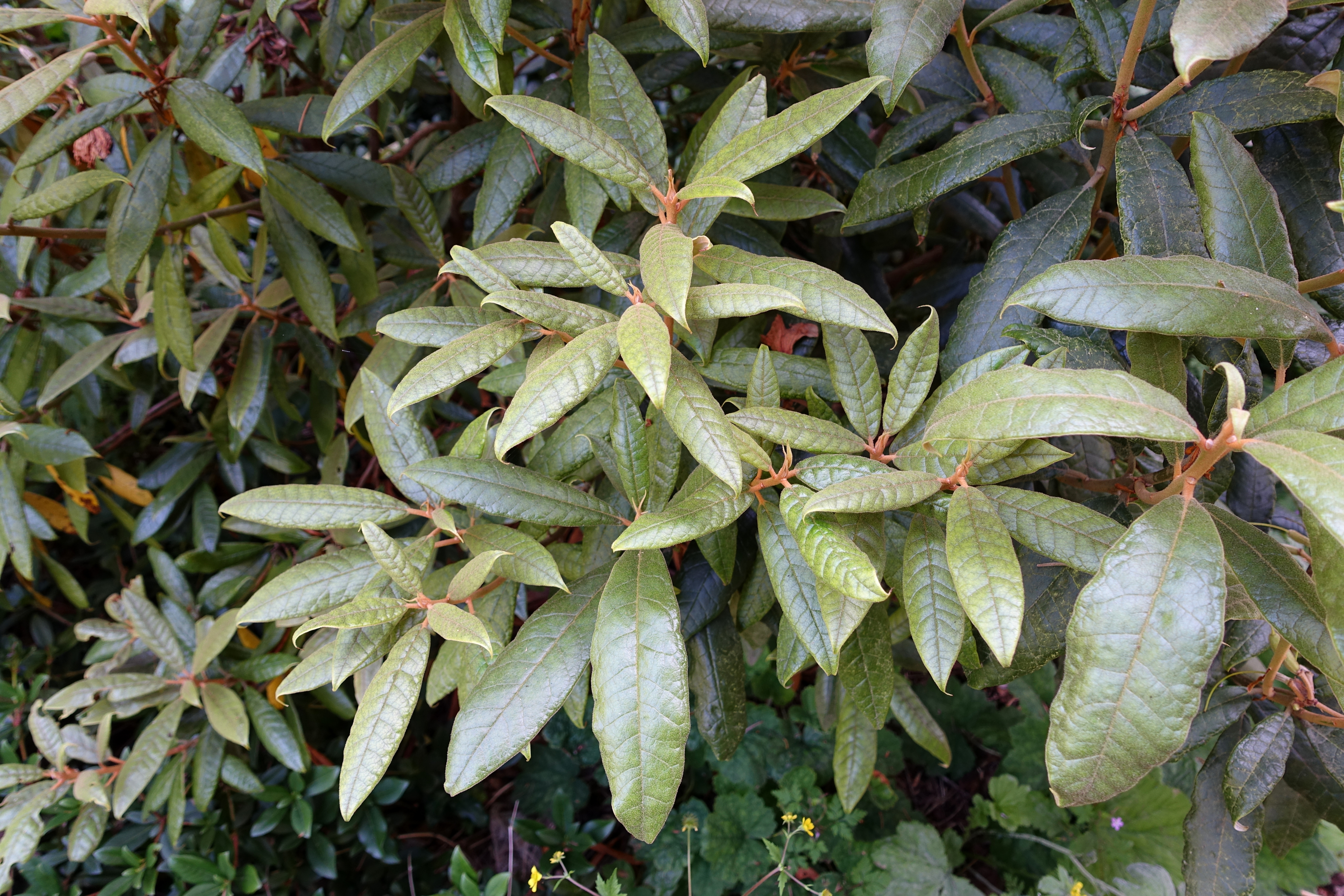

Scientific classification
- Kingdom: Plantae
- Clade: Tracheophytes
- Clade: Angiosperms
- Clade: Eudicots
- Clade: Asterids
- Order: Ericales
- Family: Ericaceae
- Genus: Rhododendron
- Species: R. coeloneurum

Binomial name
- Rhododendron coeloneurum Diels

= Rhododendron coeloneurum =

Species of flowering bush

Rhododendron coeloneurum (粗脉杜鹃) is a rhododendron species native to northern and southeastern Guizhou, southern Sichuan, and northeastern Yunnan, China, where it grows at altitudes of 1,200–2,300 m (3,900–7,500 ft). It is a tree that typically grows to 3–8 m (9.8–26.2 ft) in height, with leathery leaves that are oblanceolate to oblong-elliptic, and 7–12 × 2.5–4 cm in size. The flowers are pink to purplish, with purple spots.
