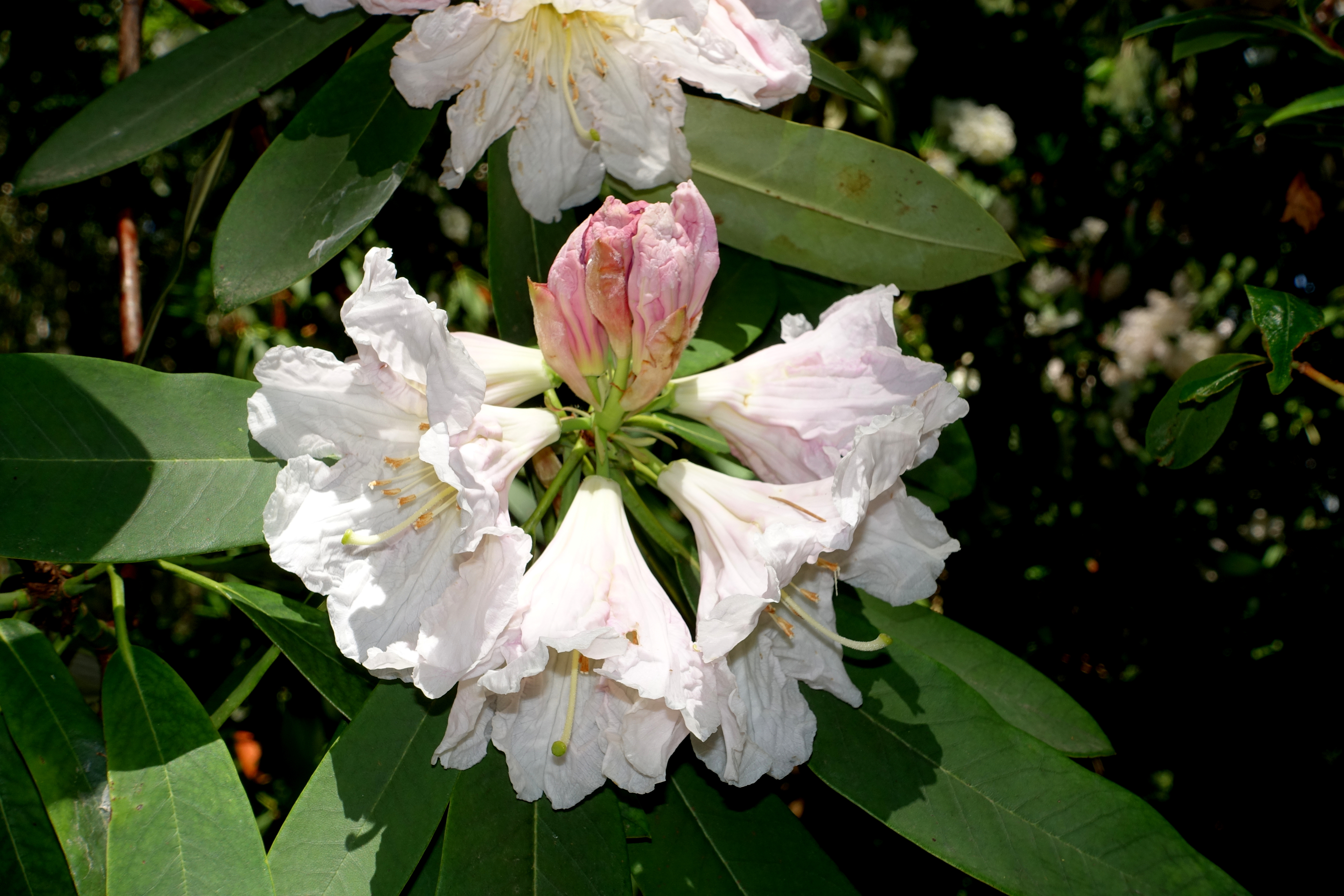

Conservation status
- Least Concern (IUCN 3.1)

Scientific classification
- Kingdom: Plantae
- Clade: Tracheophytes
- Clade: Angiosperms
- Clade: Eudicots
- Clade: Asterids
- Order: Ericales
- Family: Ericaceae
- Genus: Rhododendron
- Species: R. discolor

Binomial name
- Rhododendron discolor Franch.

Synonyms
- Rhododendron fortunei subsp. discolor (Franch.) D.F. Chamb.; Rhododendron fortunei var. houlstonii (Hemsl. & E.H. Wilson) Rehder & E.H. Wilson; Rhododendron fortunei var. kwangfuense (Chun & W.P. Fang) G.Z. Li; Rhododendron houlstonii Hemsl. & E.H. Wilson; Rhododendron kwangfuense Chun & W.P. Fang; Rhododendron mandarinorum Diels

= Rhododendron discolor =

Species of plant

Rhododendron discolor (喇叭杜鹃) is a rhododendron species native to many regions of China, where it grows at altitudes of 900–1,900 m (3,000–6,200 ft). It is a shrub or small tree that grows to 1.5–8 m (4.9–26.2 ft) in height, with leathery leaves that are oblong-elliptic or oblong-lanceolate, and 9.5–18 cm (3.7–7.1 in) × 2.4–5.4 cm (0.94–2.13 in) in size. The flowers are pale pink to white. According to Flora of China, "Rhododendron discolor intergrades with R. fortunei, and can reliably be separated from that species only by the proportionately narrower leaves."

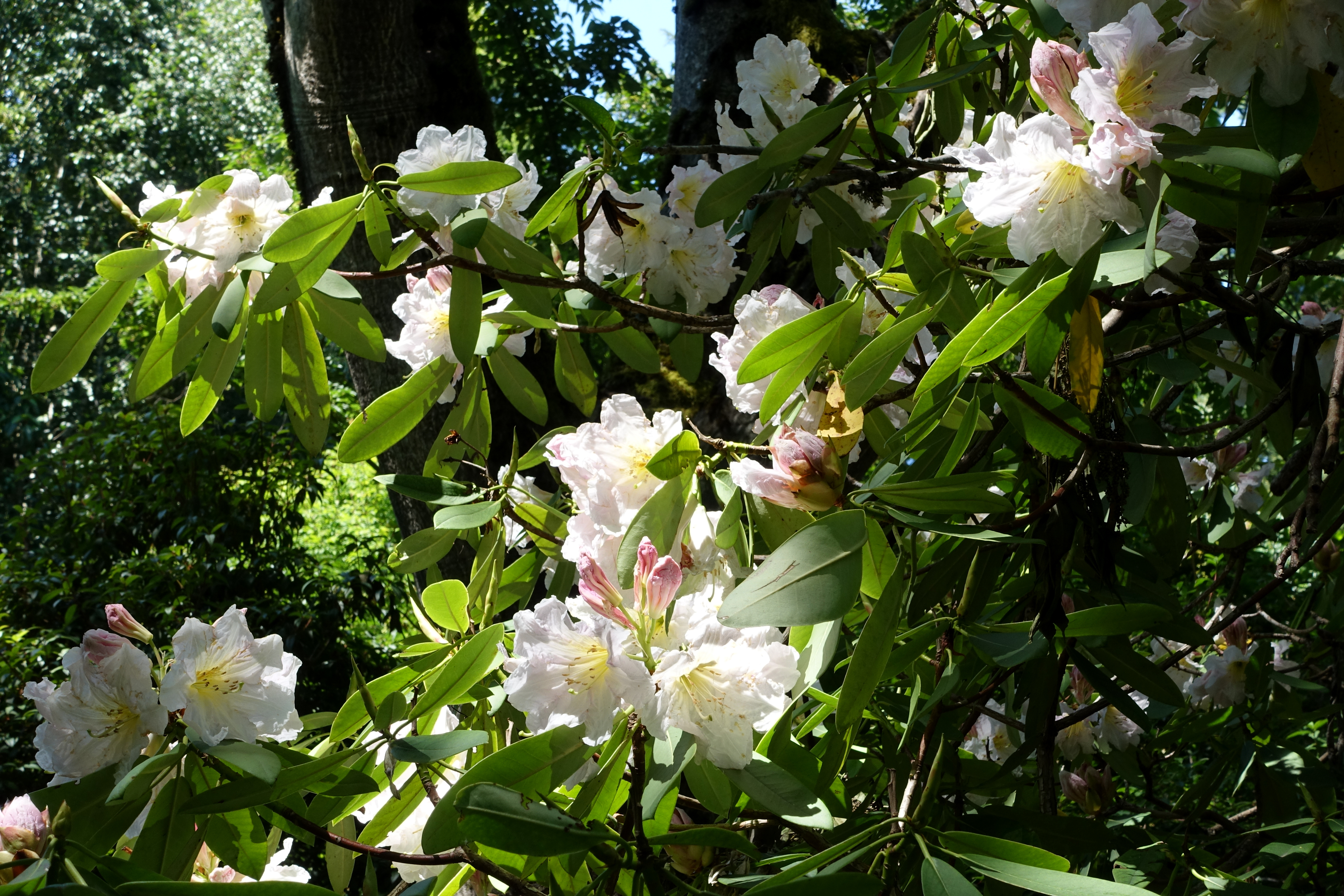

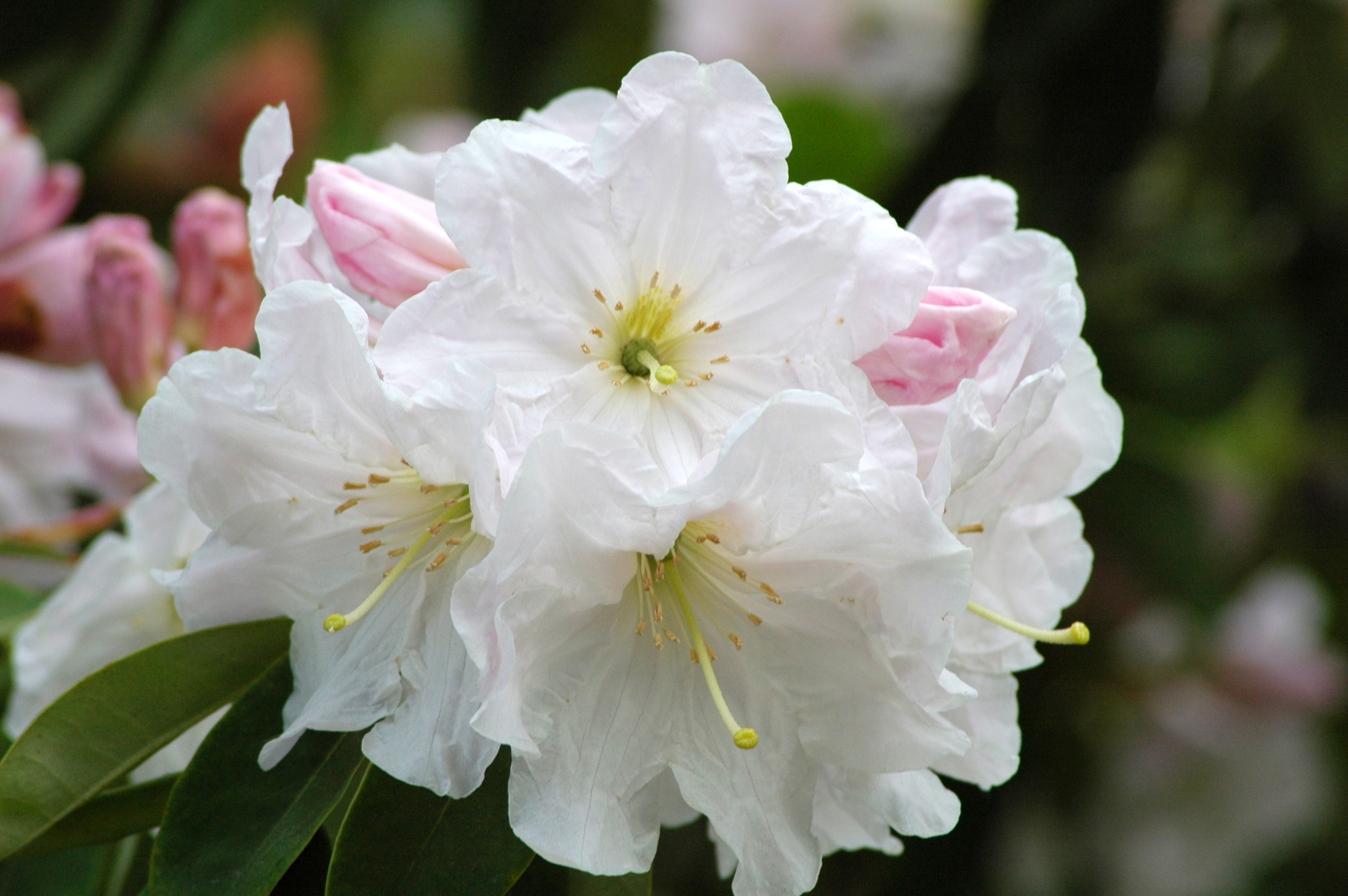
