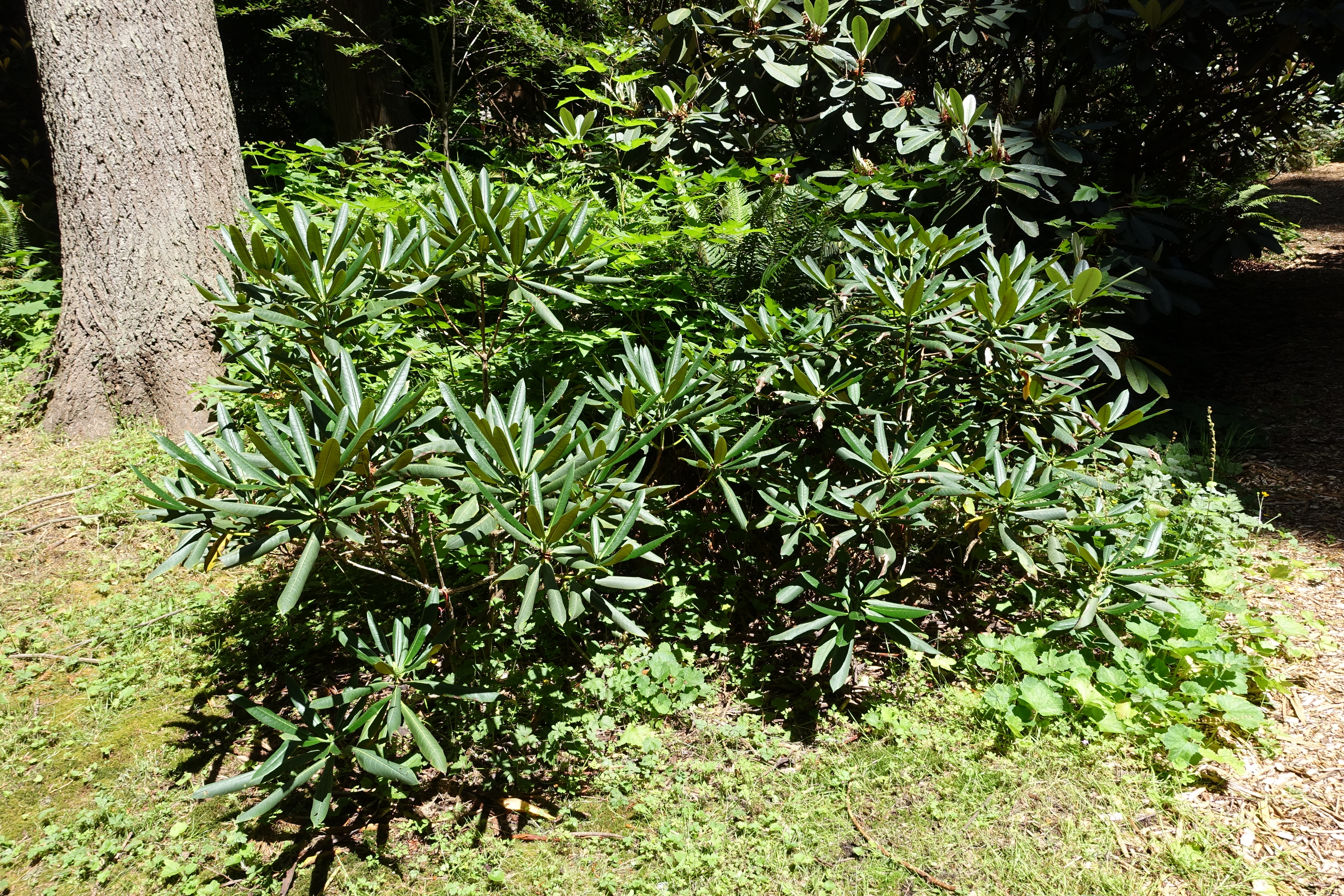

Scientific classification
- Kingdom: Plantae
- Clade: Tracheophytes
- Clade: Angiosperms
- Clade: Eudicots
- Clade: Asterids
- Order: Ericales
- Family: Ericaceae
- Genus: Rhododendron
- Species: R. beesianum

Binomial name
- Rhododendron beesianum Diels

= Rhododendron beesianum =

Species of rhododendron plant

Rhododendron beesianum (宽钟杜鹃) is a rhododendron species native to northeastern Myanmar, southeastern Tibet, and southwestern Sichuan and northwestern Yunnan in China, where it grows at altitudes of 3,200–4,500 m (10,500–14,800 ft). It is an evergreen shrub or small tree that grows to 2–9 m (6.6–29.5 ft) in height, with leathery leaves that are oblanceolate to oblong-lanceolate, and 10–25 × 3–7 cm in size. The flowers are pinkish white to pink.

It was discovered in 1902 by the Scottish botanist George Forrest, who sent seeds home. However, though hardy, it is not often found in cultivation.
