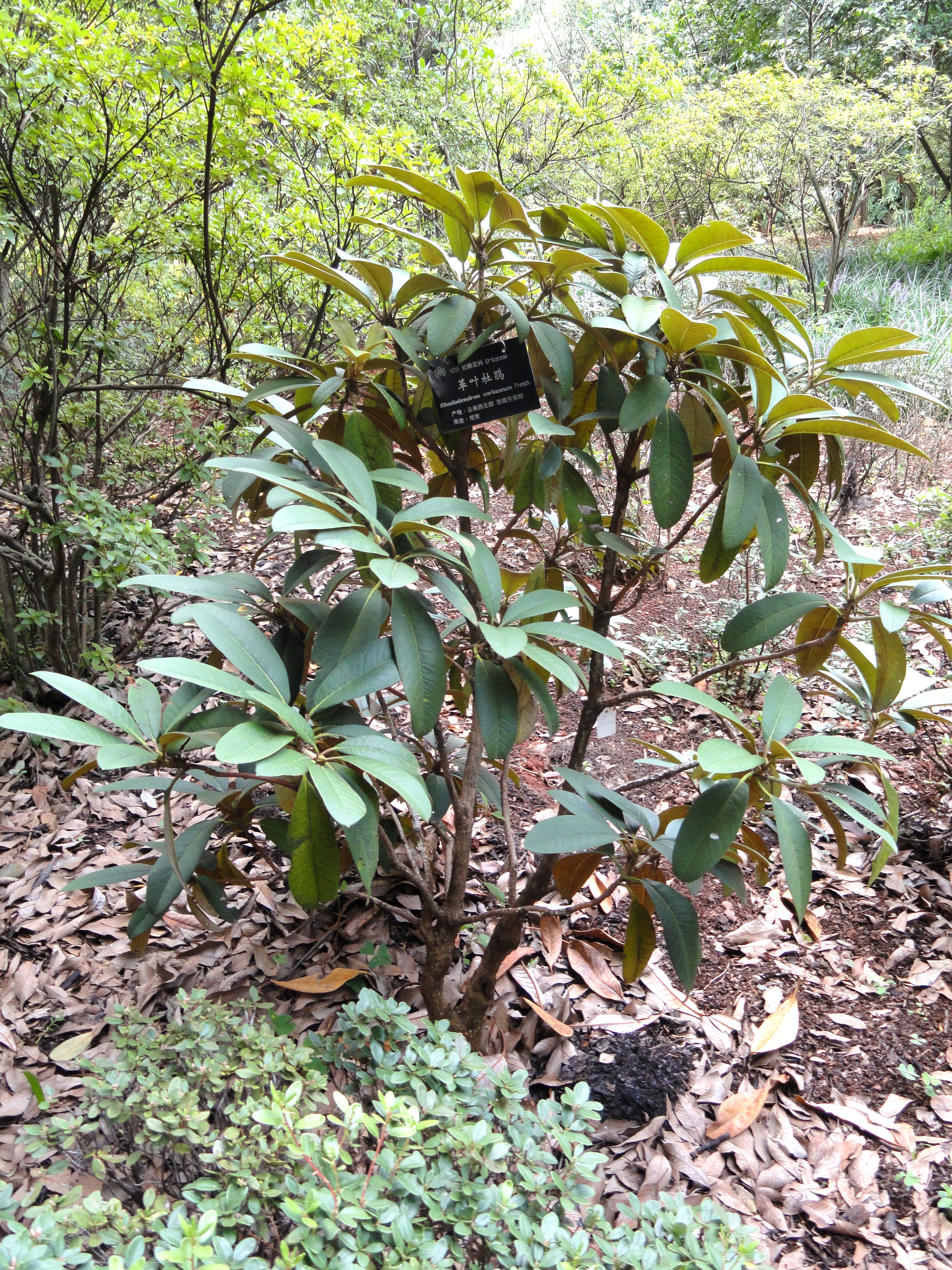

Scientific classification
- Kingdom: Plantae
- Clade: Tracheophytes
- Clade: Angiosperms
- Clade: Eudicots
- Clade: Asterids
- Order: Ericales
- Family: Ericaceae
- Genus: Rhododendron
- Species: R. coriaceum

Binomial name
- Rhododendron coriaceum Franch.

Synonyms
- Rhododendron foveolatum Rehder & E.H. Wilson

= Rhododendron coriaceum =

Species of flowering bush

Rhododendron coriaceum (革叶杜鹃) is a rhododendron species native to southeast Tibet and northwest Yunnan, China, where it grows at altitudes of 2,900–3,400 m (9,500–11,200 ft). It is an evergreen shrub or small tree that grows to 3–10 m (9.8–32.8 ft) in height, with leathery leaves that are obovate-elliptic to oblanceolate, 9–19 by 4–8 cm in size. The flowers are predominantly white.
