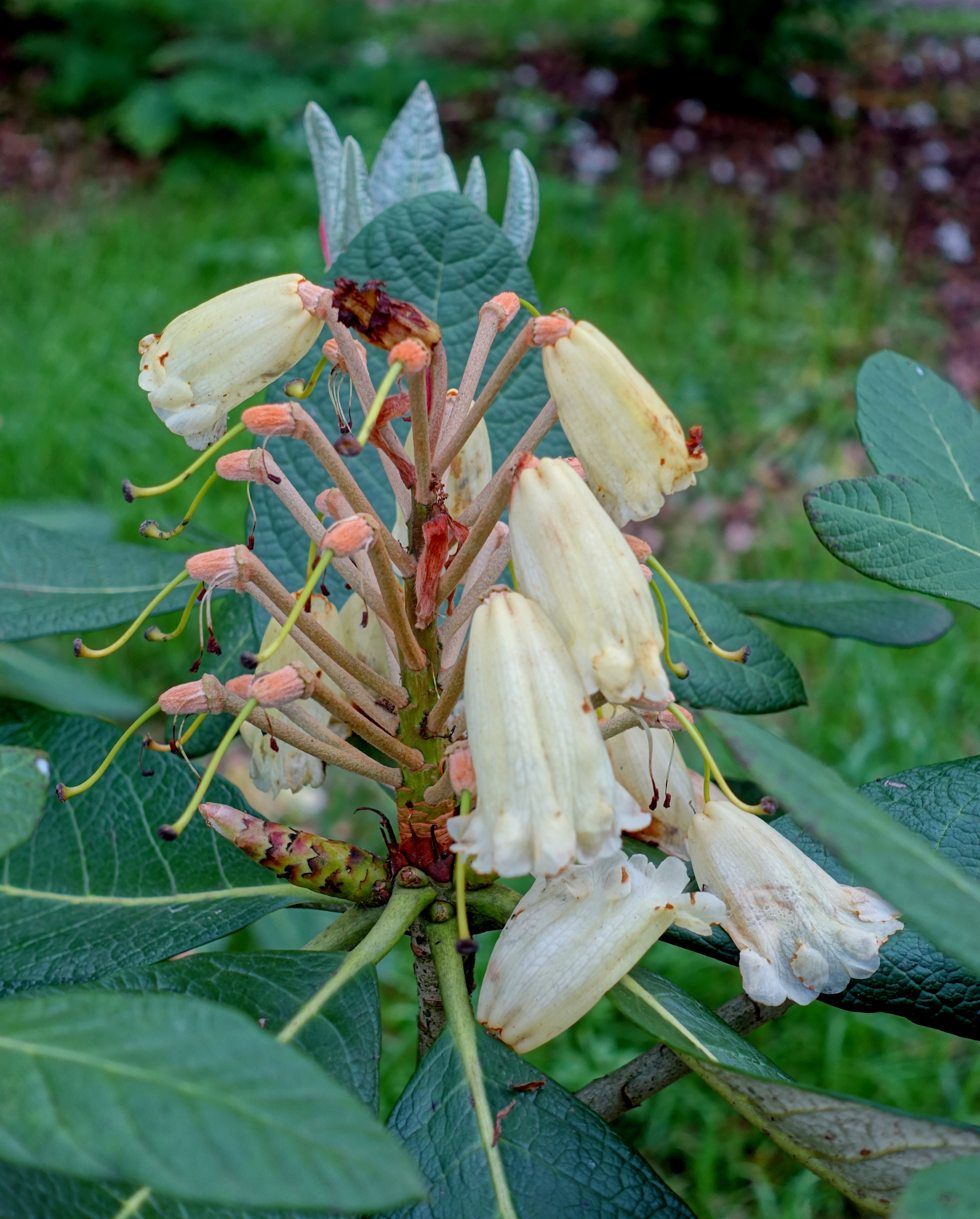
- Spent flowers
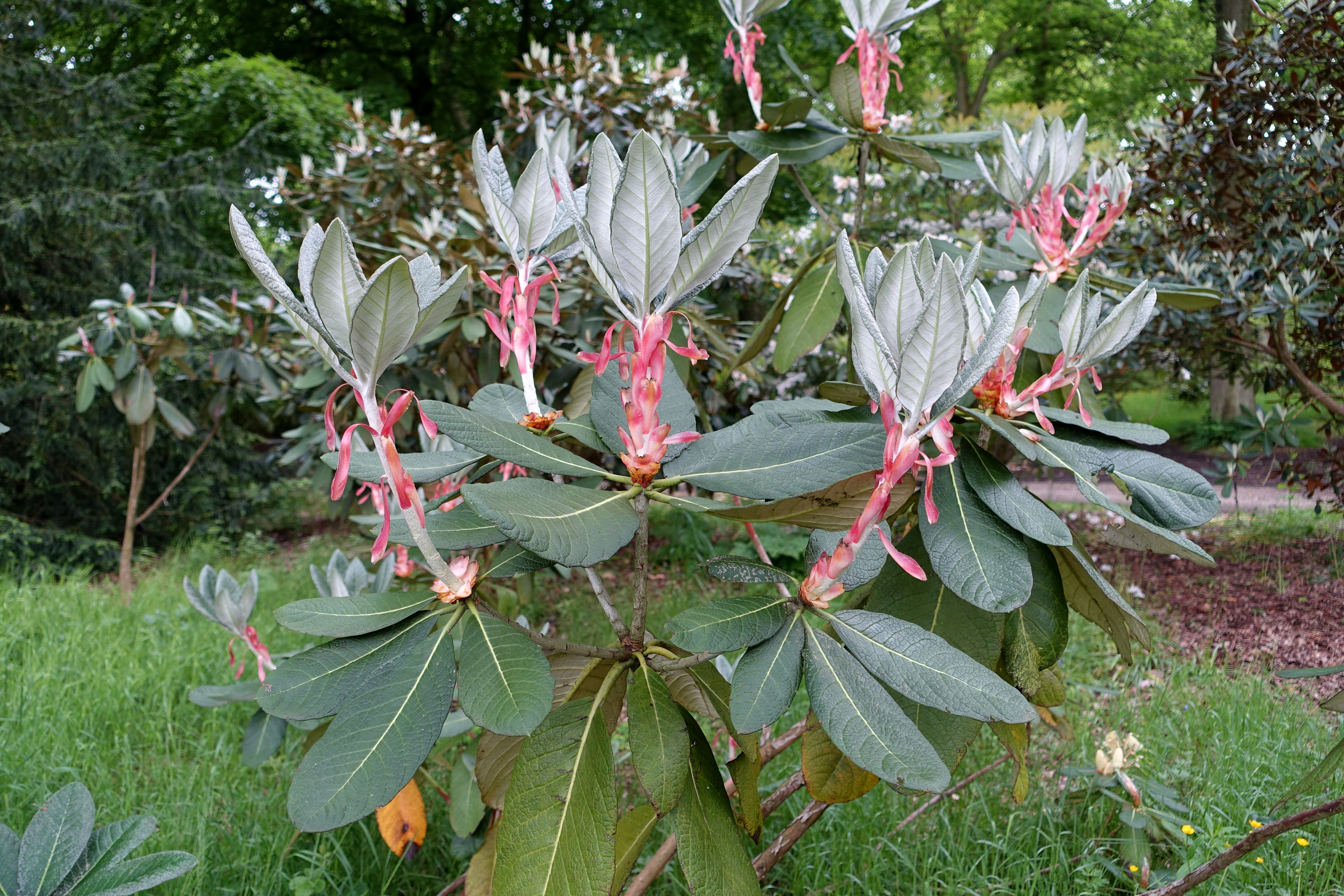
- New leaves emerging

Scientific classification
- Kingdom: Plantae
- Clade: Tracheophytes
- Clade: Angiosperms
- Clade: Eudicots
- Clade: Asterids
- Order: Ericales
- Family: Ericaceae
- Genus: Rhododendron
- Species: R. sinofalconeri

Binomial name
- Rhododendron sinofalconeri Balf.f.

= Rhododendron sinofalconeri =

Species of plant

Rhododendron sinofalconeri, the sinofalconer rhododendron, is a species of flowering plant in the family Ericaceae. It is native to southern Yunnan and northern Vietnam. An evergreen shrub or small tree reaching 3 to 10 m (10 to 30 ft), it is typically found in mixed evergreen/deciduous forests and thickets, at elevations from 1,600 to 2,500 m (5,200 to 8,200 ft) above sea level. It is available from commercial suppliers, and features trusses of 15 to 20 pale yellow flowers, each 5 cm (2 in) long, and large 30 cm (12 in) leaves.
