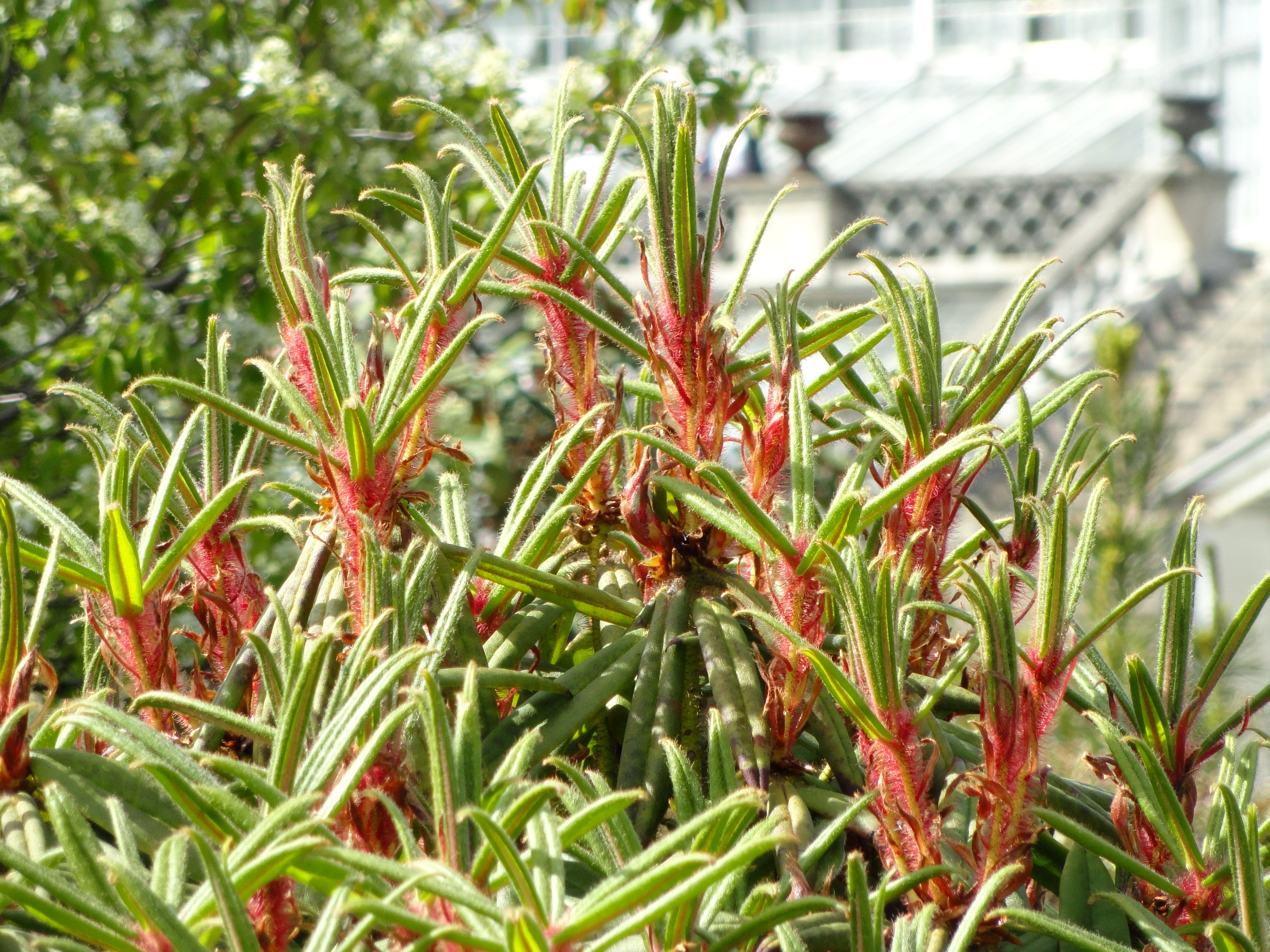

Scientific classification
- Kingdom: Plantae
- Clade: Tracheophytes
- Clade: Angiosperms
- Clade: Eudicots
- Clade: Asterids
- Order: Ericales
- Family: Ericaceae
- Genus: Rhododendron
- Species: R. strigillosum

Binomial name
- Rhododendron strigillosum Franch.

= Rhododendron strigillosum =

Species of plant

Rhododendron strigillosum (芒刺杜鹃) is a rhododendron species native to Sichuan and Yunnan in China, where it grows at altitudes of 1,600–3,800 m (5,200–12,500 ft). It is an evergreen shrub growing to 2–5 m (6.6–16.4 ft) in height, with leathery leaves that are oblong-lanceolate to lanceolate, 8–16 by 2.2–4 cm in size. The flowers are red or white.

It flowers too early (March–April) to be reliable in climates with extensive frosts, and is therefore not often seen in general cultivation.
