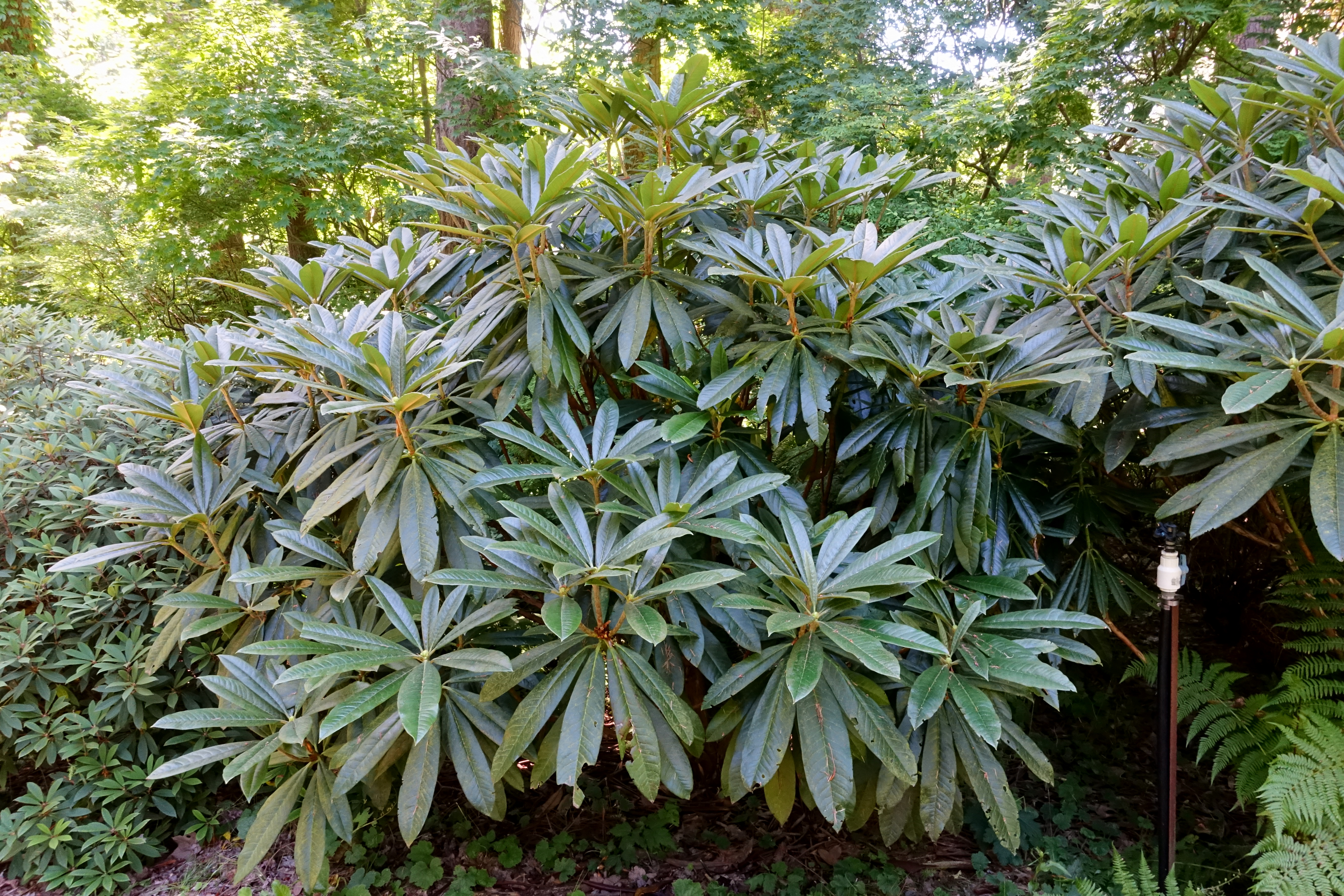

Scientific classification
- Kingdom: Plantae
- Clade: Tracheophytes
- Clade: Angiosperms
- Clade: Eudicots
- Clade: Asterids
- Order: Ericales
- Family: Ericaceae
- Genus: Rhododendron
- Species: R. asterochnoum

Binomial name
- Rhododendron asterochnoum Diels

= Rhododendron asterochnoum =

Species of tree

Rhododendron asterochnoum (汶川星毛杜鹃) is a rhododendron species native to western Sichuan, China, where it grows at altitudes of 2,200–3,600 m (7,200–11,800 ft). This small tree reaches 3–7 m (9.8–23.0 ft) in height, with leathery leaves that are broadly oblanceolate, rarely oblong-elliptic, and 17–26 × 3–9 cm in size. The flowers are pale pink or white.

== Lower taxa ==
Two variants are recognized:

- Rhododendron asterochnoum var. asterochnoum
- Rhododendron asterochnoum var. brevipedicellatum W.K.Hu

== Sources ==
- Diels, Repert. Spec. Nov. Regni Veg. 17: 196. 1921.
- Plants of the World Online
