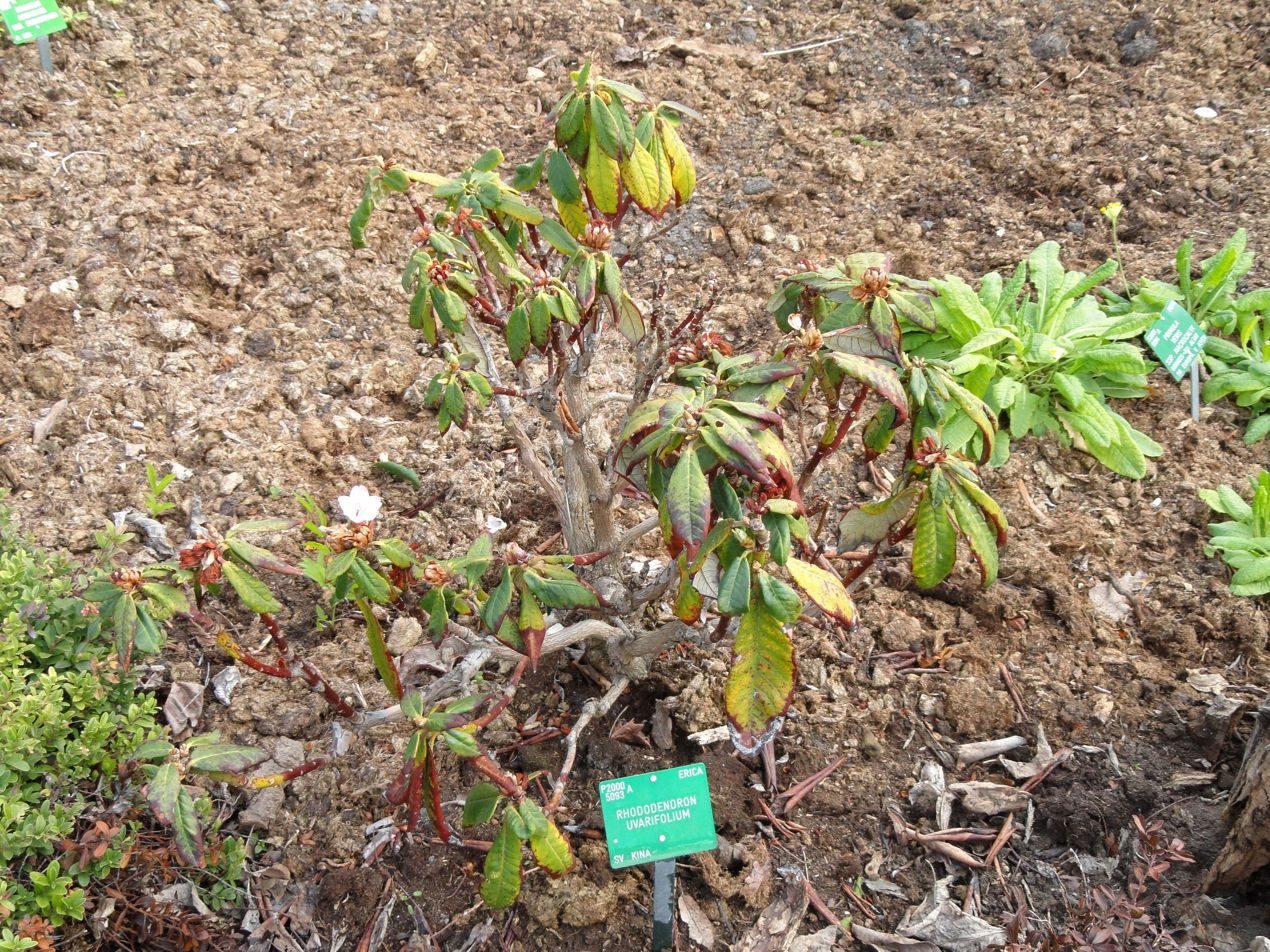

Scientific classification
- Kingdom: Plantae
- Clade: Tracheophytes
- Clade: Angiosperms
- Clade: Eudicots
- Clade: Asterids
- Order: Ericales
- Family: Ericaceae
- Genus: Rhododendron
- Species: R. uvariifolium

Binomial name
- Rhododendron uvariifolium Diels

= Rhododendron uvariifolium =

Species of plant

Rhododendron uvariifolium (紫玉盘杜鹃) is a rhododendron species native to southwestern Sichuan, southeastern Xizang, and northwestern Yunnan in China, where it grows at altitudes of 2,100–4,000 m (6,900–13,100 ft). It is an evergreen shrub or tree growing to 2–10 m (6.6–32.8 ft) in height, with leathery leaves that are oblanceolate to oblong-oblanceolate or obovate, 11–24 by 3.5–6.5 cm in size. Flowers are white, pink, or rose, with crimson basal blotch and purple spots.

== Synonyms ==
- Rhododendron dendritrichum Balf.f. & Forrestmall>
- Rhododendron monbeigii Rehder & E.H. Wilson
- Rhododendron niphargum Balf.f. & Kingdon-Ward
- Rhododendron uvariifolium var. griseum Cowan
