= Fetterbush =

Fetterbush is a common name for several plants in the family Ericaceae, and may refer to:

- Leucothoe – several species including:
  - Leucothoe fontanesiana (fetterbush)
- Pieris – several species including:
  - Pieris floribunda (mountain fetterbush)
- Lyonia lucida (fetterbush lyonia)
