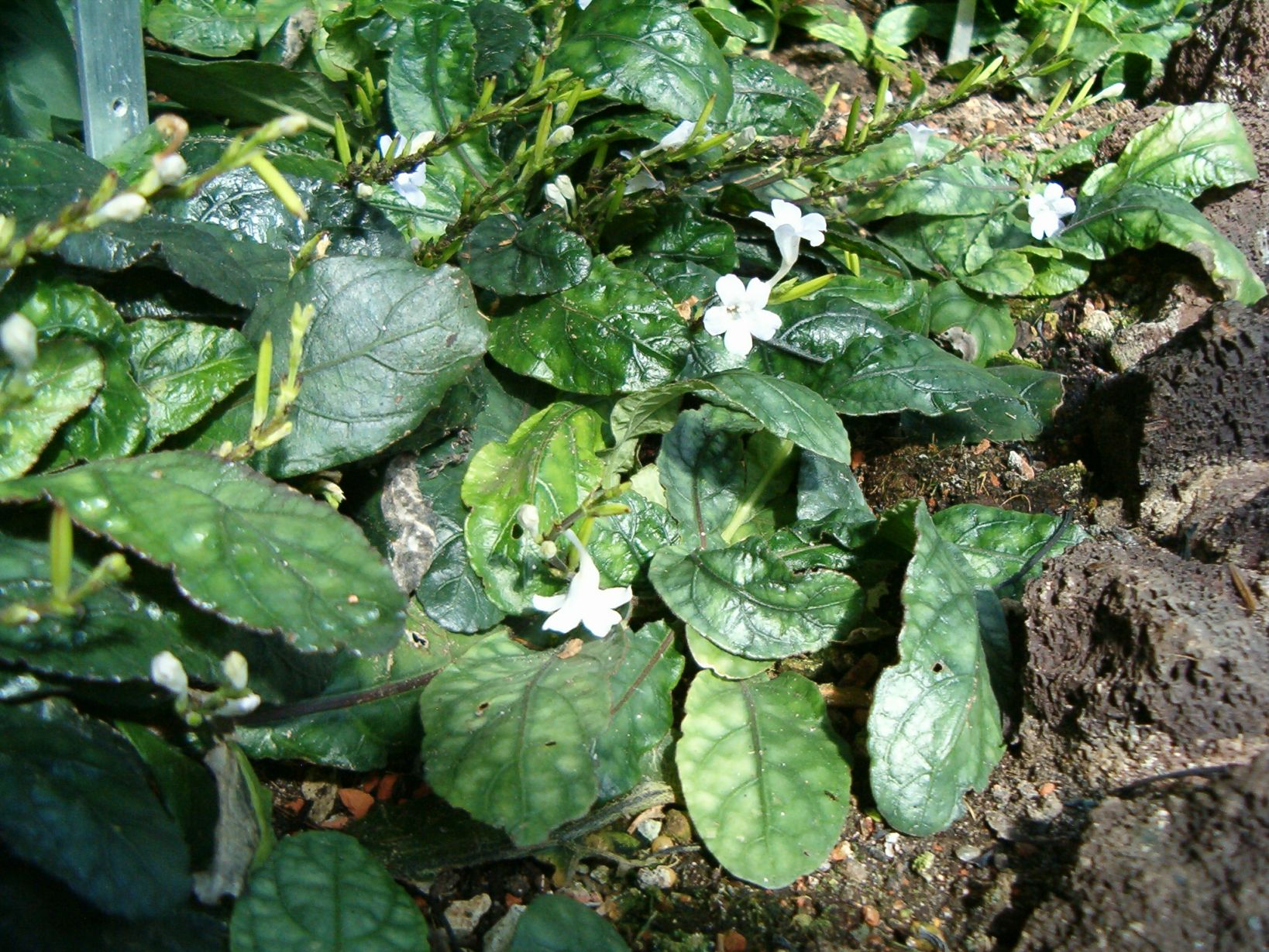

Scientific classification
- Kingdom: Plantae
- Clade: Tracheophytes
- Clade: Angiosperms
- Clade: Eudicots
- Clade: Asterids
- Order: Lamiales
- Family: Acanthaceae
- Genus: Pararuellia
- Species: P. delavayana

Binomial name
- Pararuellia delavayana (Baill.) E.Hossain (1973)

Synonyms
- Hemigraphis drymophila Diels (1912); Pararuellia drymophila (Diels) C.Y.Wu & H.S.Lo (1974); Ruellia arcuata Lingelsh. & Borza (1914); Ruellia delavayana Baill. (1891); Ruellia drymophila (Diels) Hand.-Mazz. (1924 publ. 1925); Ruellia esquirolii H.Lév. (1913)

= Pararuellia delavayana =

Species of flowering plant

Pararuellia delavayana is a plant species in the family Acanthaceae. It is a perennial native to Guizhou, southern Sichuan, and Yunnan provinces of south-central China.

== Type specimen ==
The type specimen of synonym Hemigraphis drymophila was collected by botanist George Forrest in August 1906, from the vicinity of Lijiang, Yunnan, at the forested base of a mountain (8500–10,000 ft elevation).
