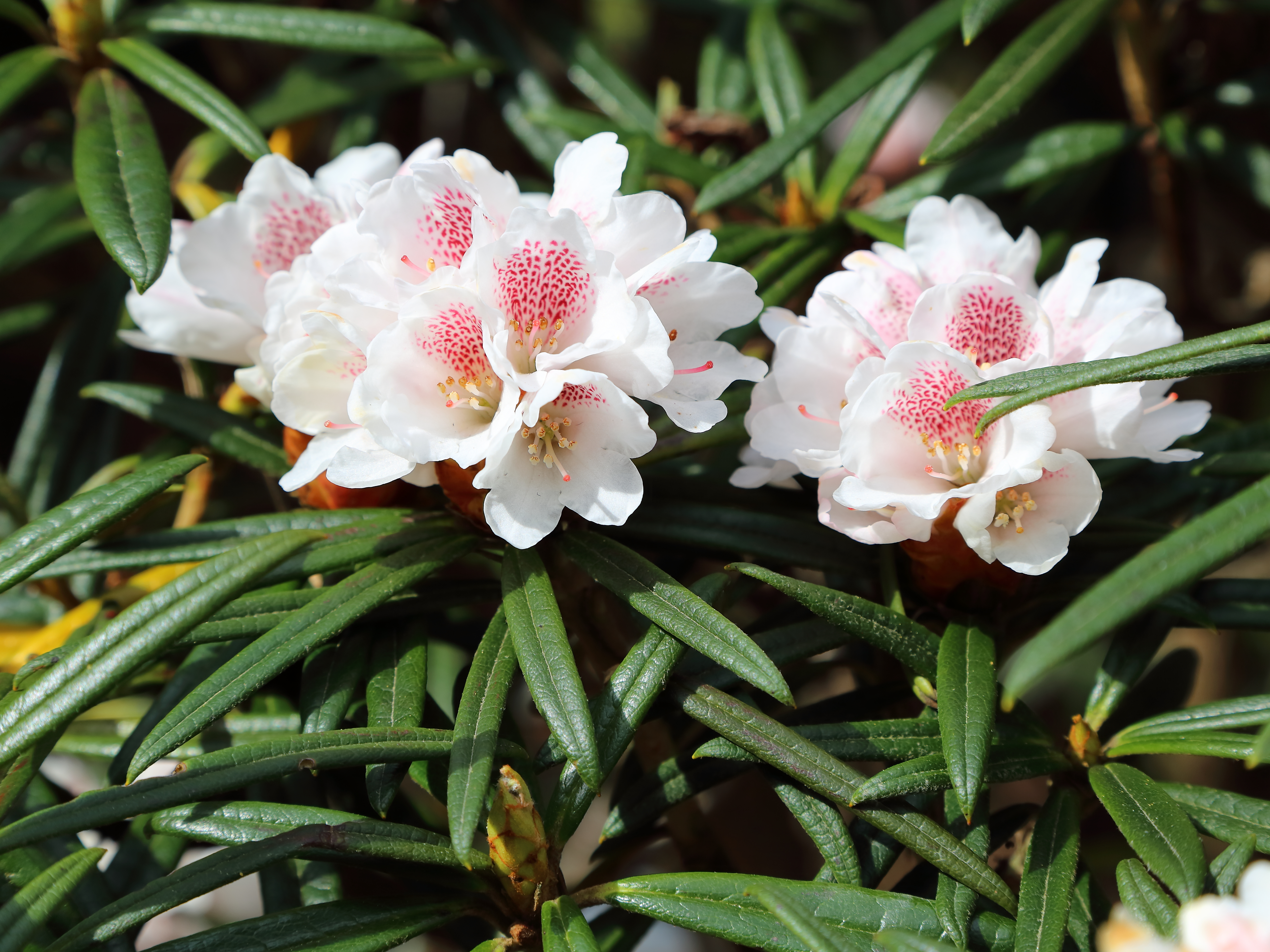

Scientific classification
- Kingdom: Plantae
- Clade: Embryophytes
- Clade: Tracheophytes
- Clade: Spermatophytes
- Clade: Angiosperms
- Clade: Eudicots
- Clade: Asterids
- Order: Ericales
- Family: Ericaceae
- Genus: Rhododendron
- Species: R. roxieanum

Binomial name
- Rhododendron roxieanum Forrest ex W.W.Sm.

Synonyms
- Synonyms list: Rhododendron aischropeplum Balf.f. & Forrest; Rhododendron poecilodermum Balf.f. & Forrest; Rhododendron recurvum Balf.f. & Forrest; Rhododendron roxieanum var. parvum Davidian; Rhododendron roxieanum var. recurvum (Balf.f. & Forrest) Davidian

= Rhododendron roxieanum =

Species of flowering plant

Rhododendron roxieanum is a species of flowering plant in the family Ericaceae, native to central China and Tibet. Its variety Rhododendron roxieanum var. oreonastes, called the mountain rolled-leaf rhododendron, has gained the Royal Horticultural Society's Award of Garden Merit.

== Varieties ==
The following varieties are currently accepted:

- Rhododendron roxieanum var. oreonastes (Balf.f. & Forrest) T.L.Ming
