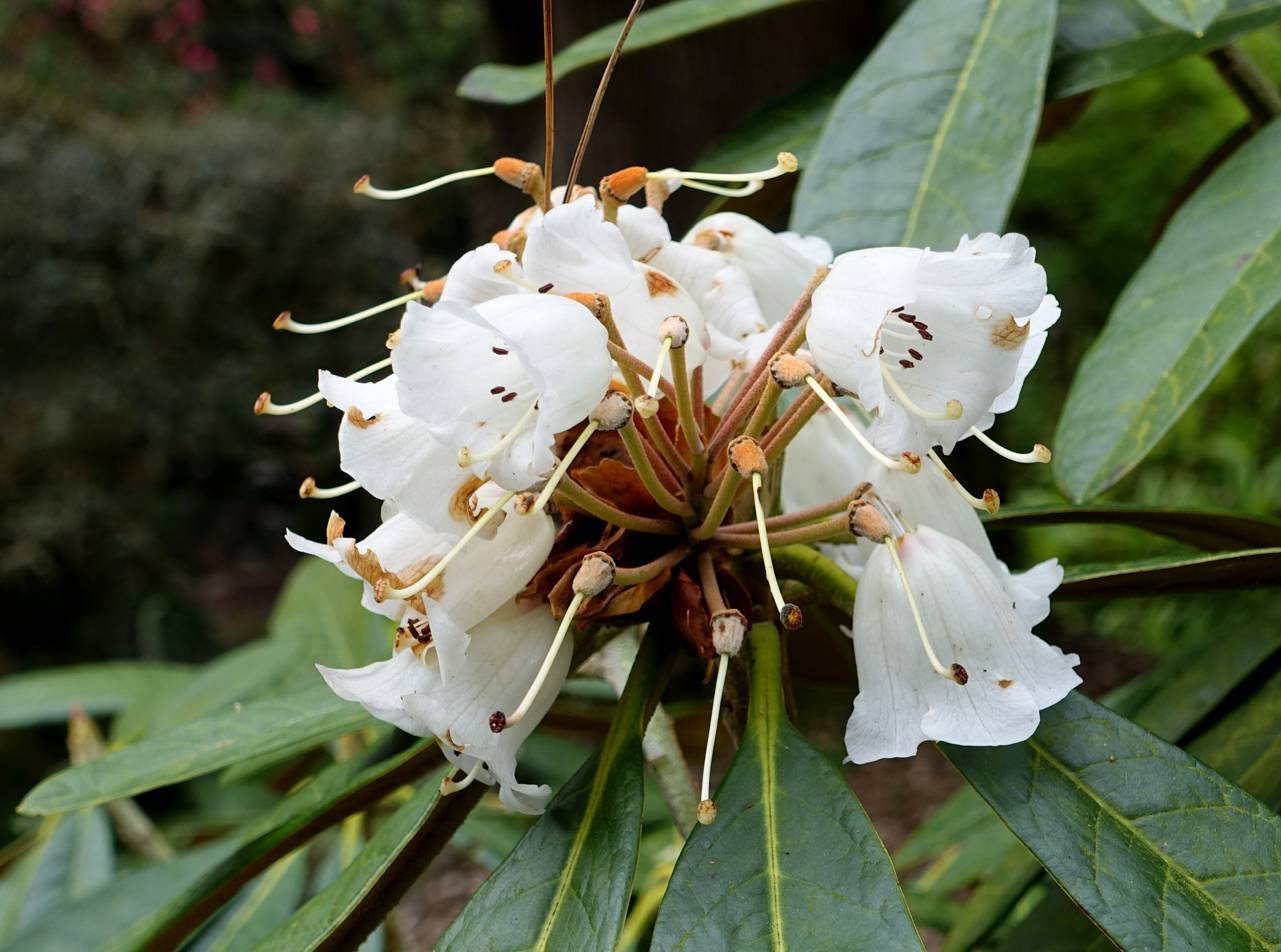

Scientific classification
- Kingdom: Plantae
- Clade: Tracheophytes
- Clade: Angiosperms
- Clade: Eudicots
- Clade: Asterids
- Order: Ericales
- Family: Ericaceae
- Genus: Rhododendron
- Species: R. arizelum

Binomial name
- Rhododendron arizelum Balf.f. & Forrest

Synonyms
- Rhododendron rex subsp. arizelum (Balf.f. & Forrest) D.F.Chamb.

= Rhododendron arizelum =

Species of plant

Rhododendron arizelum (夺目杜鹃) is a species of flowering plant in the family Ericaceae. It is native to northeastern Myanmar, southeastern Tibet, and western Yunnan, China, where it grows at altitudes of 2,500–4,000 m (8,200–13,100 ft). It is a shrub or small tree that typically grows to 3–7 m (9.8–23.0 ft) in height, with leathery leaves that are obovate or obovate-elliptic, and 9–19 × 4–8 cm in size. The flowers are white, pale yellow, or pink, with a crimson basal blotch.

== Sources ==
- I. B. Balfour & Forrest, Notes Roy. Bot. Gard. Edinburgh. 12: 90. 1920.
- The Plant List
- Flora of China
- Hirsutum
