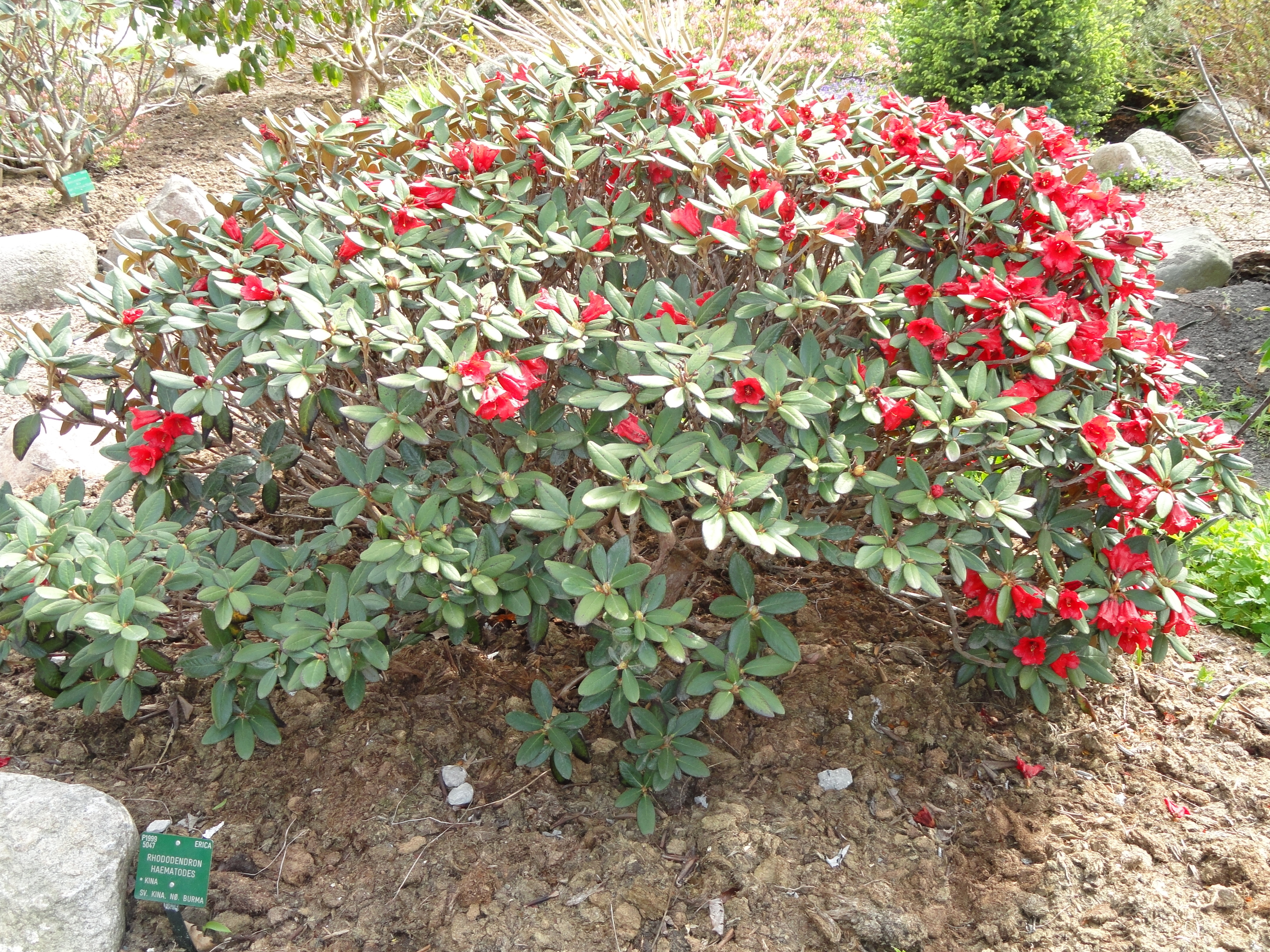

Scientific classification
- Kingdom: Plantae
- Clade: Tracheophytes
- Clade: Angiosperms
- Clade: Eudicots
- Clade: Asterids
- Order: Ericales
- Family: Ericaceae
- Genus: Rhododendron
- Species: R. haematodes

Binomial name
- Rhododendron haematodes Franch.

= Rhododendron haematodes =

Species of plant

Rhododendron haematodes (似血杜鹃) is a rhododendron species native to northeastern Myanmar, and southeastern Xizang and western Yunnan in China, where it grows at altitudes of 3,100–4,000 m (10,200–13,100 ft). It is a dwarf evergreen shrub that grows to 0.6–1.8 m (2.0–5.9 ft) in height, with leathery leaves that are oblong to obovate, 2.7–7.5 by 0.7–3.2 cm in size. The flowers are red.

The Latin specific epithet haematodes literally means "blood red", referring to the colour of the flowers.

In 1910 and 1917 the British botanist George Forrest collected seeds from specimens which may have been unusually dwarf in size, as they had previously been reported as growing much taller. It is very hardy and flowers in late Spring, thus avoiding late frosts. It is suitable for cultivation in a rock garden or similar.
