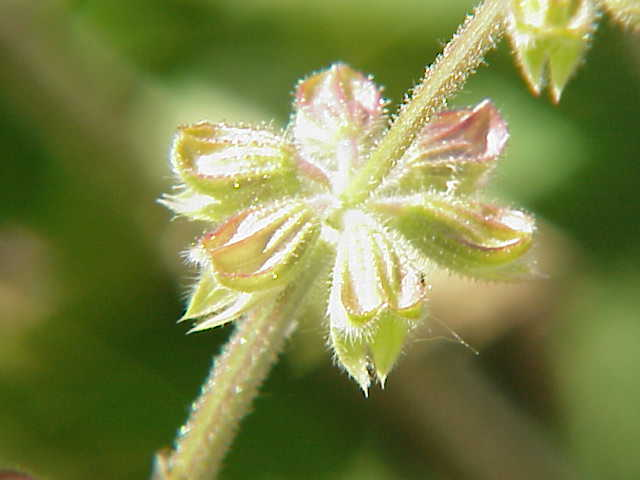

Scientific classification
- Kingdom: Plantae
- Clade: Tracheophytes
- Clade: Angiosperms
- Clade: Eudicots
- Clade: Asterids
- Order: Lamiales
- Family: Lamiaceae
- Genus: Salvia
- Species: S. bulleyana

Binomial name
- Salvia bulleyana Diels

= Salvia bulleyana =

Species of flowering plant

Salvia bulleyana is a perennial plant that is native to Yunnan province in China, growing on hillsides at 2,100 to 3,400 m (6,900 to 11,200 ft) elevation. S. bulleyana grows on a few branched stems with ovate to ovate-triangular leaves.

Inflorescences are 4 flowered verticillasters in loose racemes or panicles that are 15 to 30 cm (5.9 to 11.8 in), with a purple-blue corolla that is 2 cm (0.79 in).

S. bulleyana is closely related to and commonly mistaken for another Yunnan Salvia, Salvia flava. In Great Britain and the U.S. nursery trade, S. flava is often sold as S. bulleyana. The flowers of S. bulleyana are purple-blue with no spotting, while S. flava has yellow to yellow-brown flowers with a purple spot on the lower lip.
