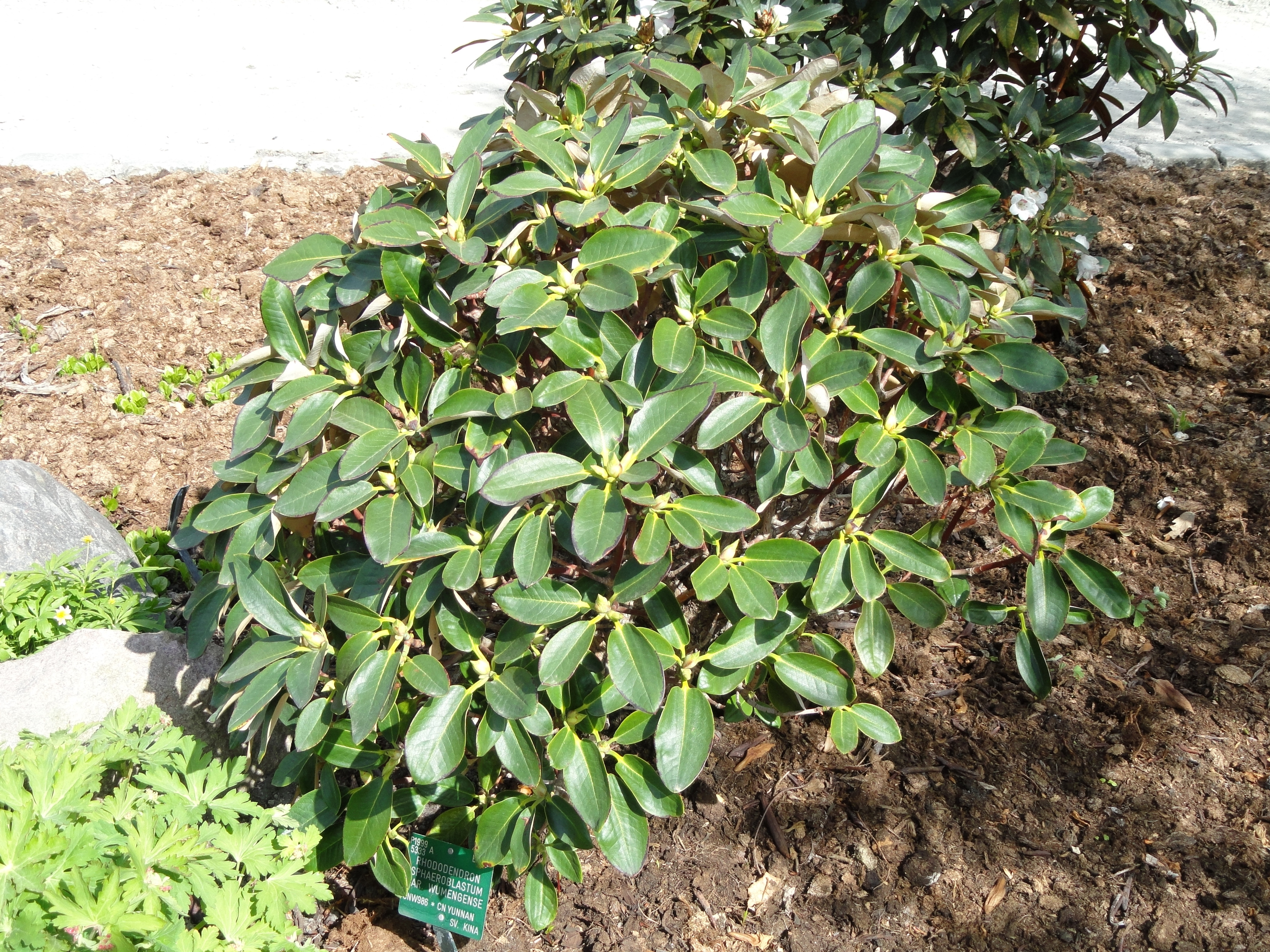
- Rhododendron sphaeroblastum var. wumengense

Scientific classification
- Kingdom: Plantae
- Clade: Tracheophytes
- Clade: Angiosperms
- Clade: Eudicots
- Clade: Asterids
- Order: Ericales
- Family: Ericaceae
- Genus: Rhododendron
- Species: R. sphaeroblastum

Binomial name
- Rhododendron sphaeroblastum Balf.f. & Forrests

= Rhododendron sphaeroblastum =

Species of plant

Rhododendron sphaeroblastum (宽叶杜鹃) is a species of flowering plant in the family Ericaceae. It is native to southwestern Sichuan and northern Yunnan in China, where it grows at altitudes of 3,300–4,400 m (10,800–14,400 ft). It is an evergreen shrub growing to 1–3 m (3.3–9.8 ft) in height, with leathery leaves that are ovate to oblong-ovate or ovate-elliptic, 7–15 by 4–6.5 cm in size. The flowers are white, pink, red, or yellow.

== Sources ==
- "Rhododendron sphaeroblastum", I. B. Balfour & Forrest, Notes Roy. Bot. Gard. Edinburgh. 13: 60. 1920.
