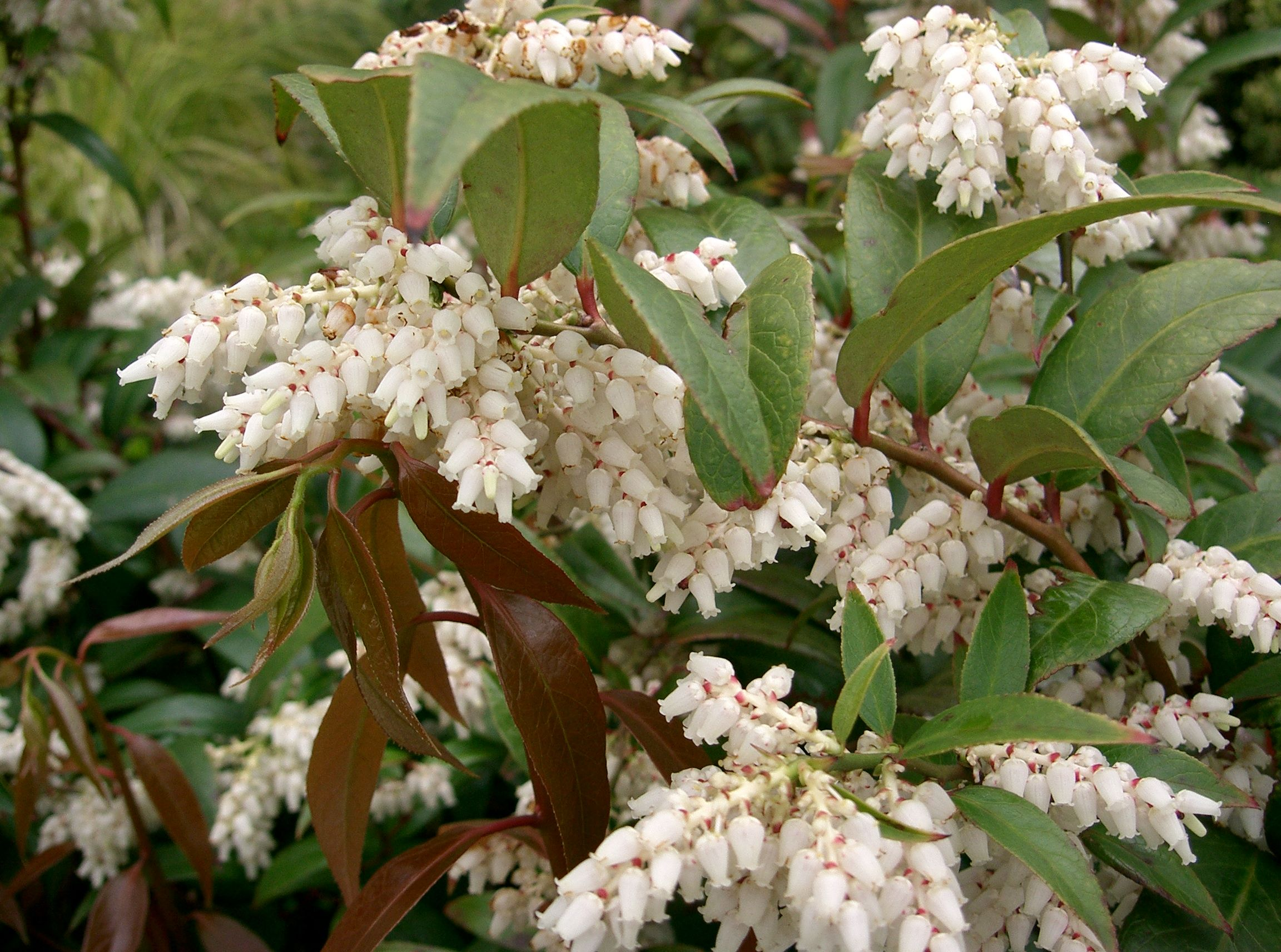
- Leucothoe axillaris

Scientific classification
- Kingdom: Plantae
- Clade: Tracheophytes
- Clade: Angiosperms
- Clade: Eudicots
- Clade: Asterids
- Order: Ericales
- Family: Ericaceae
- Subfamily: Vaccinioideae
- Tribe: Gaultherieae
- Genus: Leucothoe; D.Don

= Leucothoe (plant) =

Genus of flowering plants

Leucothoe is a genus of about 6 species of flowering plants in the family Ericaceae, native to Asia and the Americas. Many species have the common name doghobble. Leucothoe species contain grayanotoxins, a group of closely related neurotoxins named after Leucothoe grayana, native to Japan.

They are shrubs growing to 1–3 m tall, either deciduous or evergreen depending on species. The leaves are alternate, oblong-lanceolate, 2–15 cm long. The flowers are produced in racemes 3–15 cm long, each flower bell-shaped, 4–20 mm long, white or occasionally pink.

Selected species

- Leucothoe axillaris (coastal doghobble; southeastern United States)
- Leucothoe davisiae (black laurel; Sierra Nevada, northern California & Oregon)
- Leucothoe fontanesiana (highland doghobble or drooping leucothoe; southeastern United States)
- Leucothoe grayana (Japan)
- Leucothoe griffithiana (eastern Himalaya, southwest China)
- Leucothoe keiskei (Japan)
- Leucothoe populifolia (southeastern United States)
- Leucothoe racemosa (swamp doghobble or sweetbells; eastern United States)
- Leucothoe recurva (redtwig doghobble; southeastern United States)
- Leucothoe tonkinensis (southern China, northern Vietnam)
