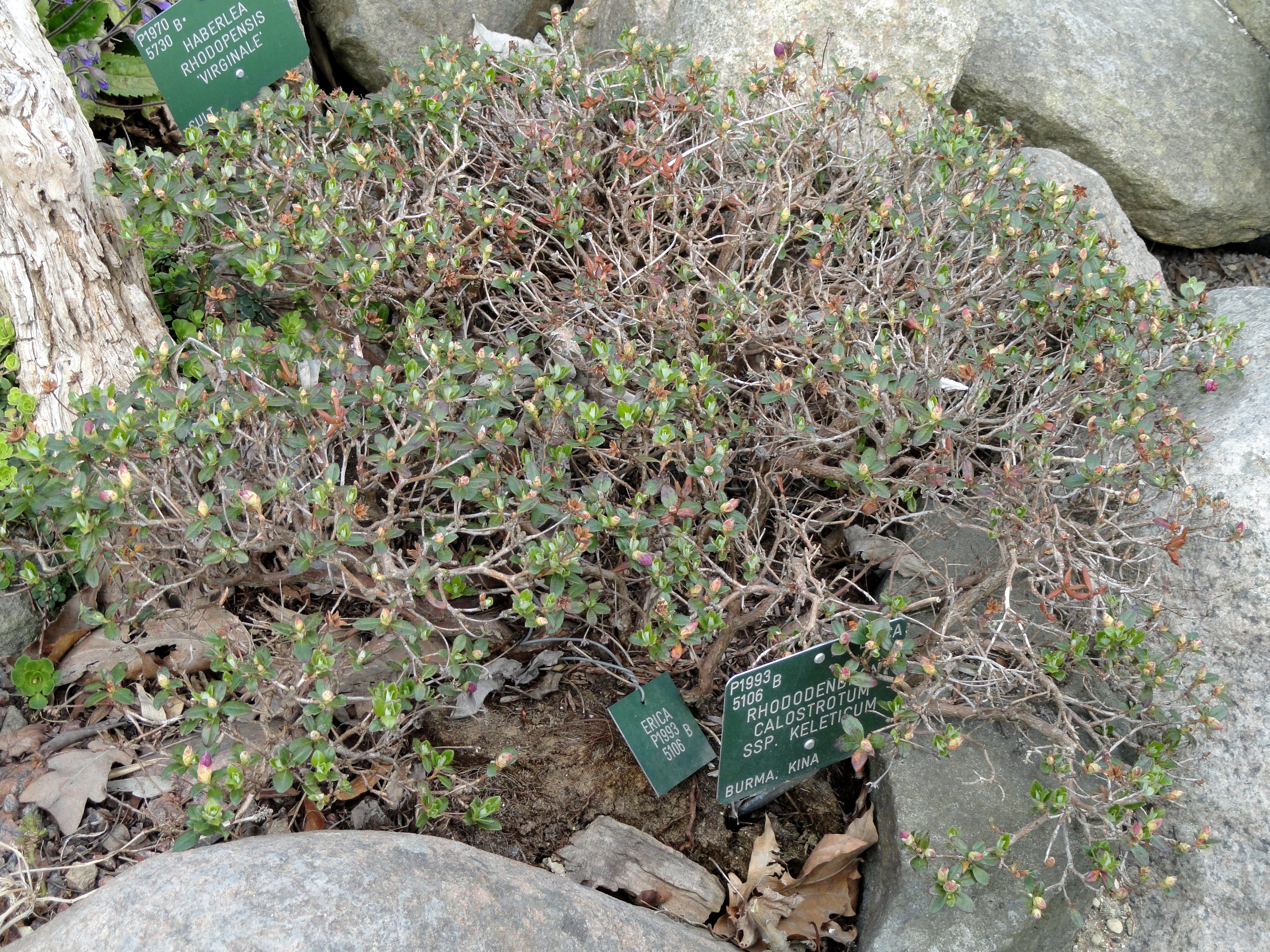

Scientific classification
- Kingdom: Plantae
- Clade: Tracheophytes
- Clade: Angiosperms
- Clade: Eudicots
- Clade: Asterids
- Order: Ericales
- Family: Ericaceae
- Genus: Rhododendron
- Species: R. keleticum

Binomial name
- Rhododendron keleticum Balf.f. & Forrest

Synonyms
- Rhododendron calostrotum subsp. keleticum (Balf.f. & Forrest) Cullen; Rhododendron radicans Balf.f. & Forrest

= Rhododendron keleticum =

Species of plant

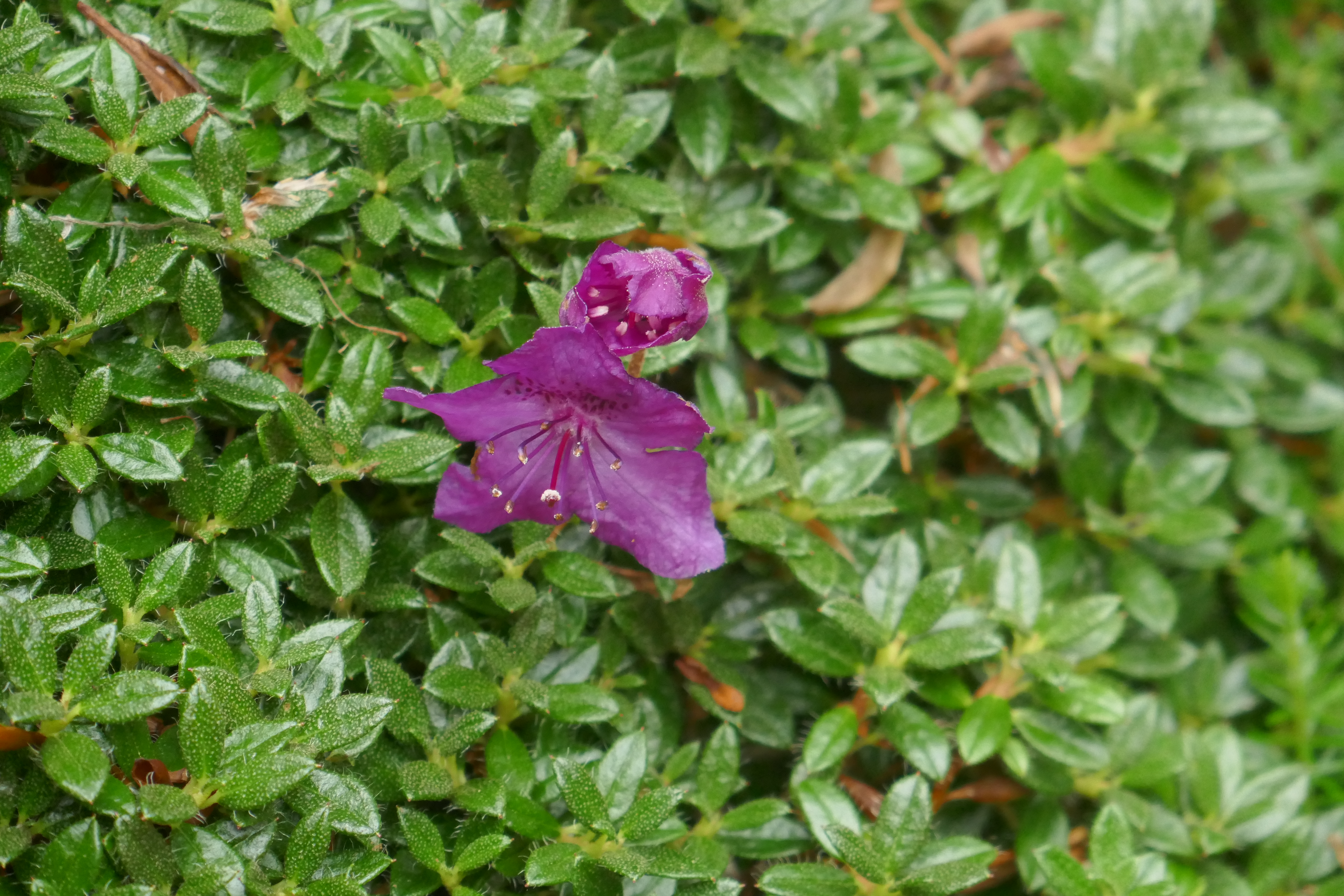
R. keleticum in flower in north Wales

Rhododendron keleticum (独龙杜鹃) is a species of flowering plant in the family Ericaceae, native to southeast Xizang and northwest Yunnan, China, as well as Myanmar. It grows at altitudes of 3,000–3,900 m (9,800–12,800 ft). It is a dwarf evergreen shrub growing to 5–30 cm (2.0–11.8 in) in height, forming either a mound or a mat of vegetation. It has leathery leaves, elliptic-lanceolate, elliptic, or ovate in shape, 0.6–2 by 0.3–1 cm in size. The flowers are pale purplish red or green tinged with red.

This hardy shrub is possibly the most suitable for a rock garden.
