= Daemilus fulva =

Scientific classification
- Domain: Eukaryota
- Kingdom: Animalia
- Phylum: Arthropoda
- Class: Insecta
- Order: Lepidoptera
- Family: Tortricidae
- Genus: Daemilus
- Species: D. fulva

Binomial name
- Daemilus fulva (Filipjev, 1962)

Synonyms
- Cacoecia fulva Filipjev, 1962; Daemilus fulvus

Species of moth

Daemilus fulva is a species of moth of the family Tortricidae. It was described by Ivan Nikolayevich Filipjev in 1962 and is found in Korea, Japan and Russia (Siberia).

The wingspan is 12 mm for males.

The larvae feed on Abies firma and Pieris japonica.
