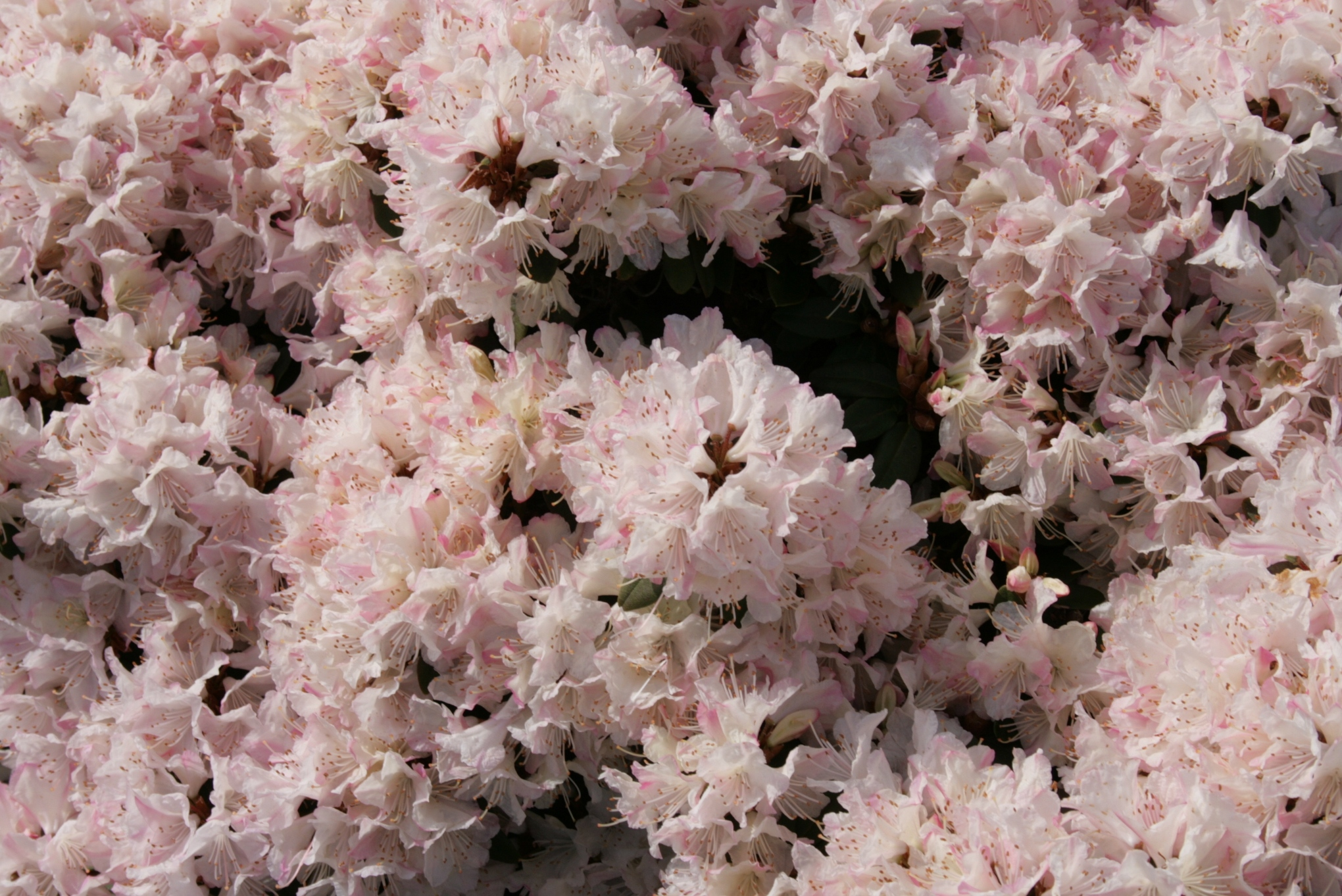

Scientific classification
- Kingdom: Plantae
- Clade: Tracheophytes
- Clade: Angiosperms
- Clade: Eudicots
- Clade: Asterids
- Order: Ericales
- Family: Ericaceae
- Genus: Rhododendron
- Species: R. traillianum

Binomial name
- Rhododendron traillianum Forrest & W.W.Sm.

= Rhododendron traillianum =

Species of plant

Rhododendron traillianum (川滇杜鹃) is a rhododendron species native to southwest Sichuan, southeast Tibet, and northwest Yunnan, China, where it grows at altitudes of 3,000–4,300 m (9,800–14,100 ft). It is an evergreen shrub or small tree that grows to 2–8 m (6.6–26.2 ft) in height, with leaves that are oblong-lanceolate to elliptic, 5–12 by 2.5–5 cm in size. The flowers are white or pink, with crimson spots and purple-red basal flecks.

== Synonyms ==
- Rhododendron aberrans Tagg & Forrest
