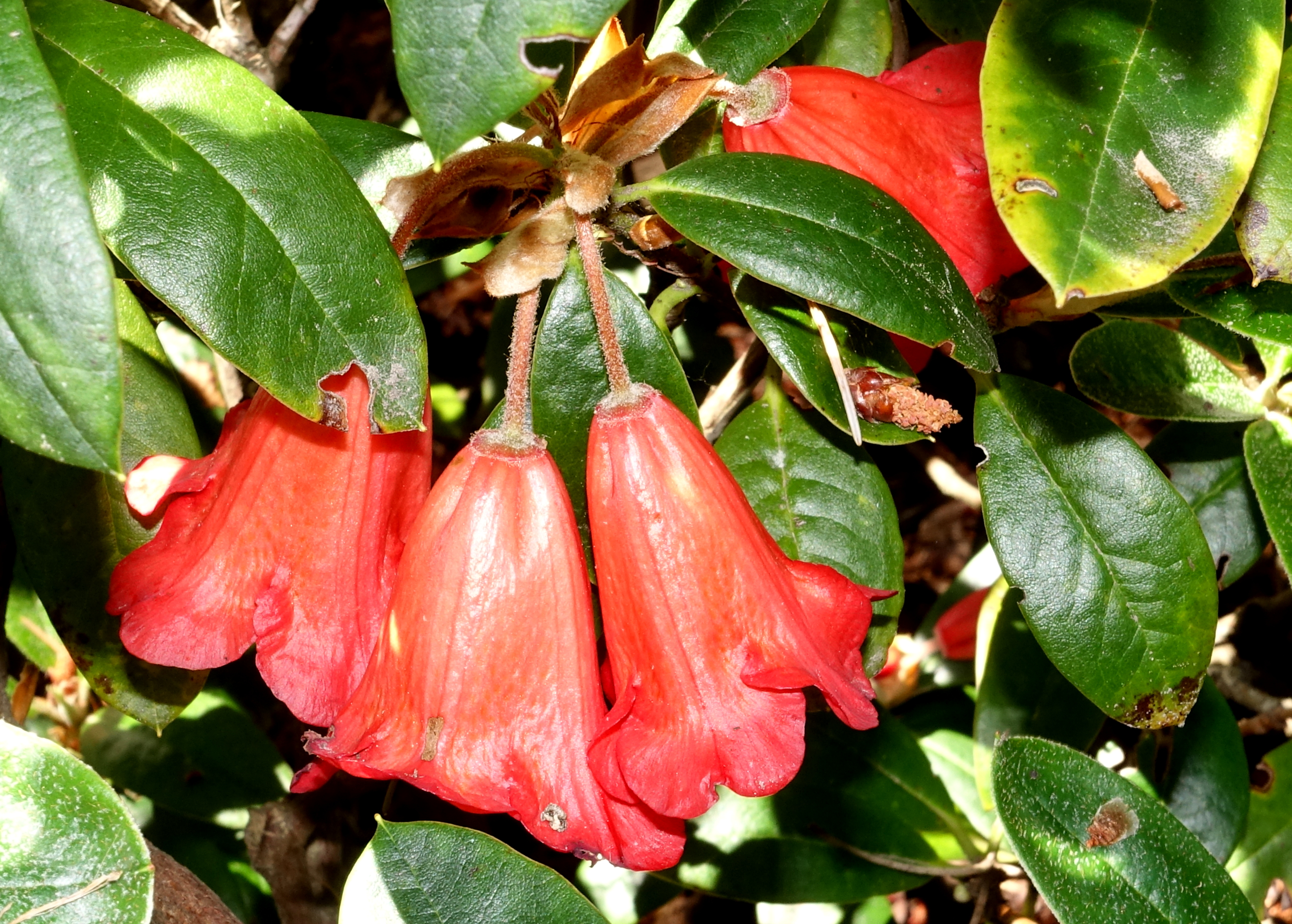

Scientific classification
- Kingdom: Plantae
- Clade: Tracheophytes
- Clade: Angiosperms
- Clade: Eudicots
- Clade: Asterids
- Order: Ericales
- Family: Ericaceae
- Genus: Rhododendron
- Subgenus: Rhododendron subg. Hymenanthes
- Section: Rhododendron sect. Ponticum
- Species: R. eudoxum

Binomial name
- Rhododendron eudoxum Balf.f. & Forrest

Synonyms
- Of var. brunneifolium: Rhododendron brunneifolium Balf.f. & Forrest; Rhododendron eudoxum subsp. brunneifolium (Balf.f. & Forrest) Tagg; Of var. eudoxum: Rhododendron eudoxum subsp. trichomiscum (Balf.f. & Forrest) Tagg; Rhododendron fulvastrum subsp. trichomiscum (Balf.f. & Forrest) Cowan; Rhododendron fulvastrum subsp. trichophlebium (Balf.f. & Forrest) Cowan; Rhododendron temenium subsp. albipetalum Cowan; Rhododendron temenium subsp. rhodanthum Cowan; Rhododendron trichomiscum Balf.f. & Forrest; Rhododendron trichophlebium Balf.f. & Forrest; Of var. mesopolium: Rhododendron asteium Balf.f. & Forrest; Rhododendron epipastum Balf.f. & Forrest; Rhododendron eudoxum subsp. asteium (Balf.f. & Forrest) Tagg; Rhododendron eudoxum subsp. epipastum (Balf.f. & Forrest) Tagg; Rhododendron eudoxum subsp. mesopolium (Balf.f. & Forrest) Tagg; Rhododendron fulvastrum subsp. epipastum (Balf.f. & Forrest) Cowan; Rhododendron fulvastrum subsp. mesopolium (Balf.f. & Forrest) Cowan; Rhododendron mesopolium Balf.f. & Forrest

= Rhododendron eudoxum =

Species of plant

Rhododendron eudoxum is a species of flowering plant in the Ericaceae family. It is native to the bamboo forests of southeast Xizang and northwest Yunnan, China, where it grows at altitudes of 3,300–4,300 m (10,800–14,100 ft). It is a dwarf shrub that typically grows to 30–120 cm (1 ft 0 in – 3 ft 11 in) tall, with leathery leaves that are long-elliptic to oblong-obovate in shape, and 2.3–3 cm (0.9–1.2 in) long and 0.8–1.4 cm (0.3–0.6 in) wide. Its flowers are red. It is placed in section Ponticum.

== Varieties ==
As of February 2024, Plants of the World Online accepted three varieties:

- Rhododendron eudoxum var. brunneifolium (Balf.f. & Forrest) D.F.Chamb.
- Rhododendron eudoxum var. eudoxum
- Rhododendron eudoxum var. mesopolium (Balf.f. & Forrest) D.F.Chamb.

== Sources ==
- I. B. Balfour & Forrest, Notes Roy. Bot. Gard. Edinburgh. 11: 62. 1919.
- Flora of China
- Hirsutum.com
- Danish Soc. of ARS
