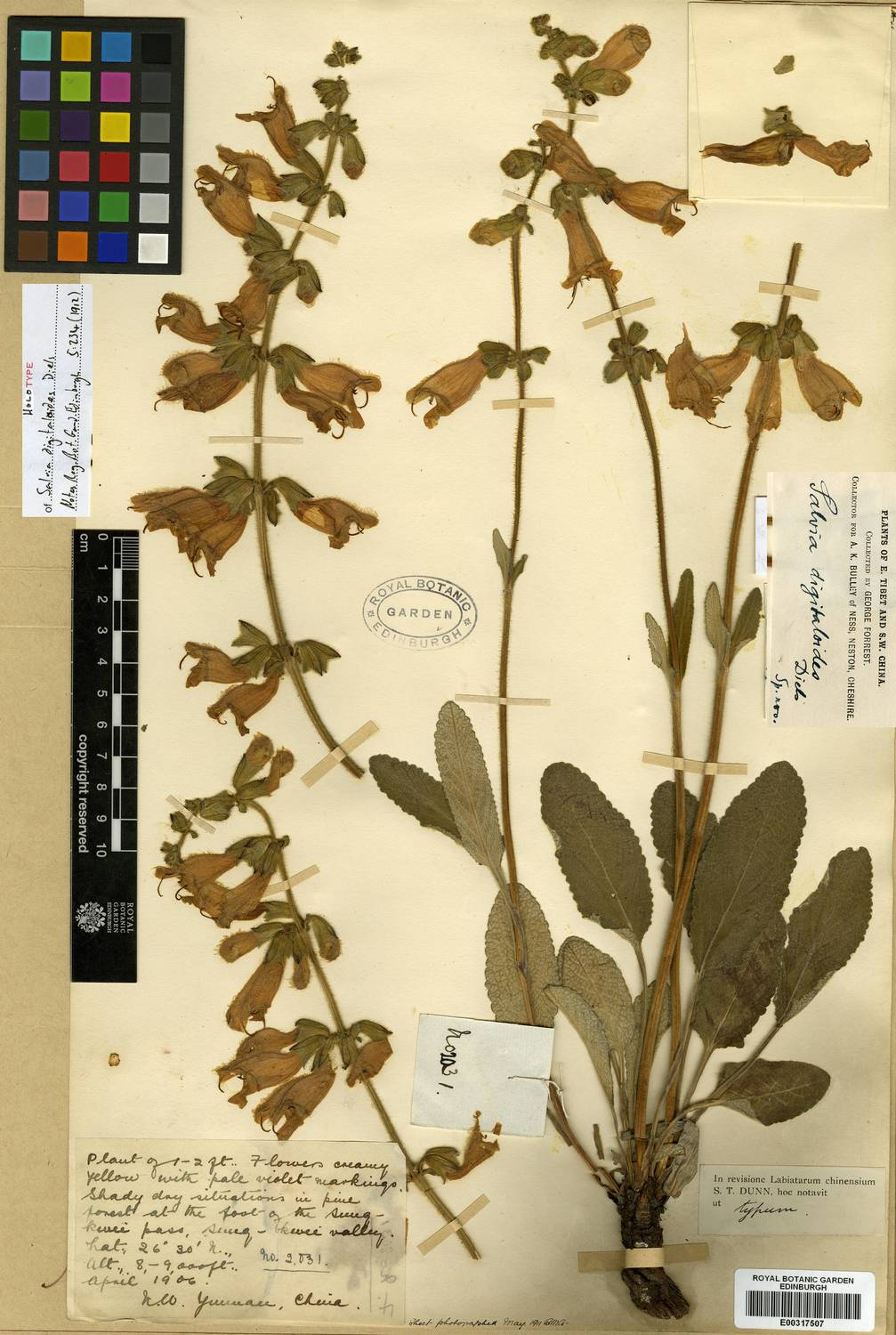

Scientific classification
- Kingdom: Plantae
- Clade: Tracheophytes
- Clade: Angiosperms
- Clade: Eudicots
- Clade: Asterids
- Order: Lamiales
- Family: Lamiaceae
- Genus: Salvia
- Species: S. digitaloides

Binomial name
- Salvia digitaloides Diels

= Salvia digitaloides =

Species of shrub

Salvia digitaloides (the Chinese foxglove sage) is a herbaceous perennial shrub native to the Chinese provinces of Guizhou, Sichuan, and Yunnan, first collected by Scot botanist George Forrest and named by Friedrich Ludwig Emil Diels in Germany in 1912, from Forrest's specimens. In its native habitat it grows between 7,000 and 11,000 ft elevation in dry shady pine forests, in east-facing scrub oak forests, and on grassy hillsides and valleys. Uncommon in horticulture, seeds have been collected and plants displayed at Quarryhill Botanical Garden in Glen Ellyn, California. The plant is used medicinally in Yunnan.

Salvia digitaloides forms a 1–2 ft high and wide clump, with thick velvety looking oblong leaves that are rounded at the top and base, with the edges rolled slightly under, and with white veining on the underside. The soft yellow flowers are about 1 in long, on 6 in inflorescences, with 4-6 flowers in widely spaced whorls. The upper lip is broadly triangular, while the lower lip is longer and dusted with purple spots. The green calyx has purple veins, and every part of the plant is covered with long straight hairs.
