= Daemilus rufapex =

Scientific classification
- Kingdom: Animalia
- Phylum: Arthropoda
- Class: Insecta
- Order: Lepidoptera
- Family: Tortricidae
- Genus: Daemilus
- Species: D. rufapex

Binomial name
- Daemilus rufapex Razowski, 2009

Species of moth

Daemilus rufapex is a moth of the family Tortricidae. It is found in Vietnam.

The wingspan is 20 mm.
