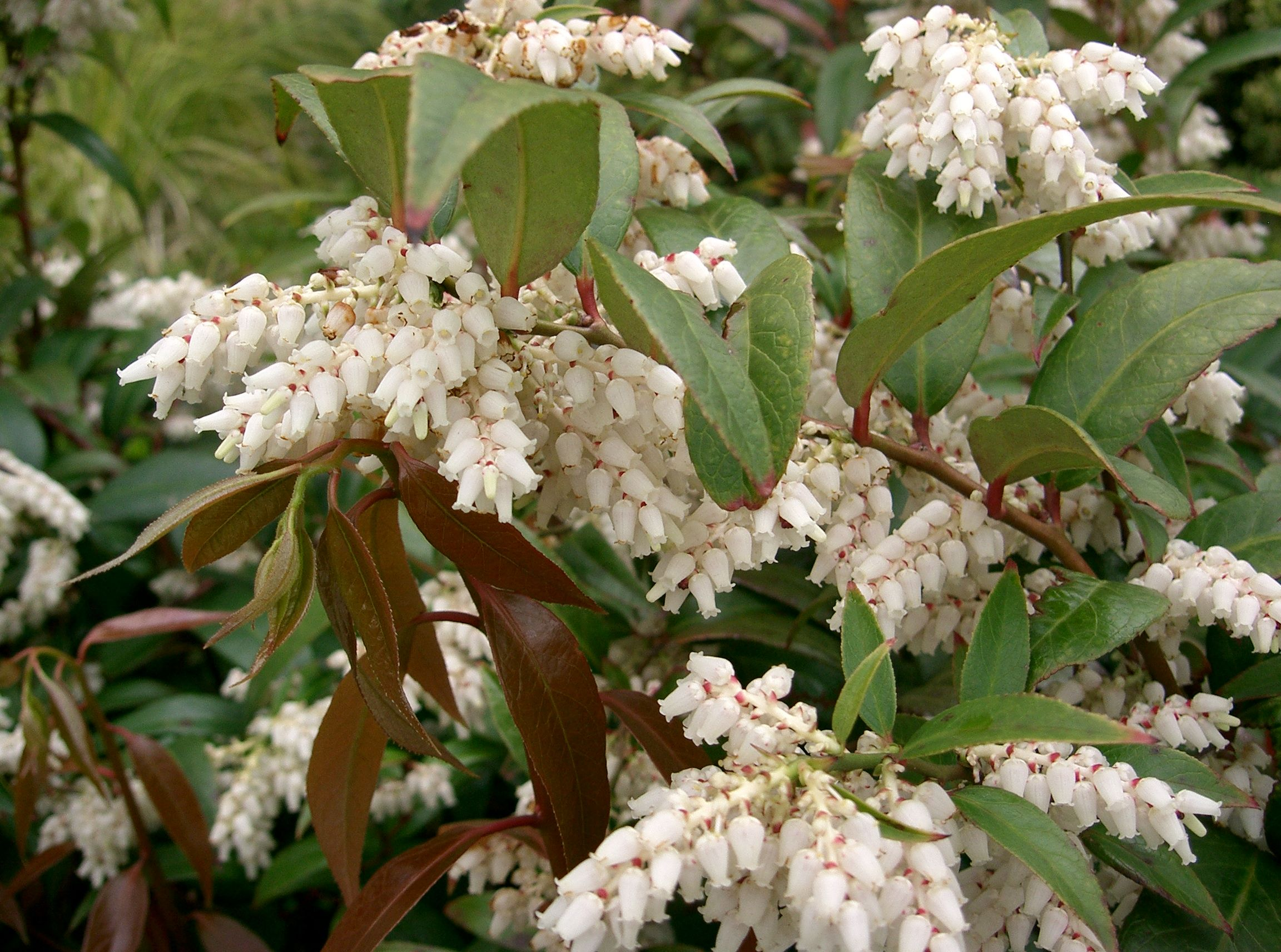

Scientific classification
- Kingdom: Plantae
- Clade: Tracheophytes
- Clade: Angiosperms
- Clade: Eudicots
- Clade: Asterids
- Order: Ericales
- Family: Ericaceae
- Genus: Leucothoe
- Species: L. axillaris

Binomial name
- Leucothoe axillaris (Lam.) D. Don

Synonyms
- List: Andromeda acuminata Sm.; Andromeda axillaris Lam.; Andromeda axillaris var. longifolia Pursh; Andromeda catesbaei Walter; Andromeda hahniana Meerb.; Andromeda halmiana Steud.; Andromeda longifolia Pursh; Andromeda spinulosa Pursh; Leucothoe axillaris var. ambigens Fernald; Leucothoe axillaris var. longifolia (Pursh) DC.; Leucothoe catesbaei (Walter) A.Gray; Leucothoe platyphylla Small; Leucothoe spinulosa G.Don; Lyonia axillaris (Lam.) K.Koch; Lyonia catesbaei (Walter) K.Koch

= Leucothoe axillaris =

Species of shrub

Leucothoe axillaris is a shrub native to the southeastern United States, with the common names swamp dog-laurel and coastal dog-hobble. It has been reported from Louisiana, Mississippi, Alabama, Florida, Georgia, North and South Carolina and Virginia. It grows on floodplains in coastal areas at elevations of less than 200 m (660 ft).

Leucothoe axillaris is a branching shrub up to 2 m (7 ft) tall. Leaves are up to 8 cm (3 in) long. Flowers are white, cylindrical, up to 8 mm (0.3 in) long. Fruit is a dry capsule.

The cultivar Scarletta = 'Zeblid' has won the Royal Horticultural Society's Award of Garden Merit.

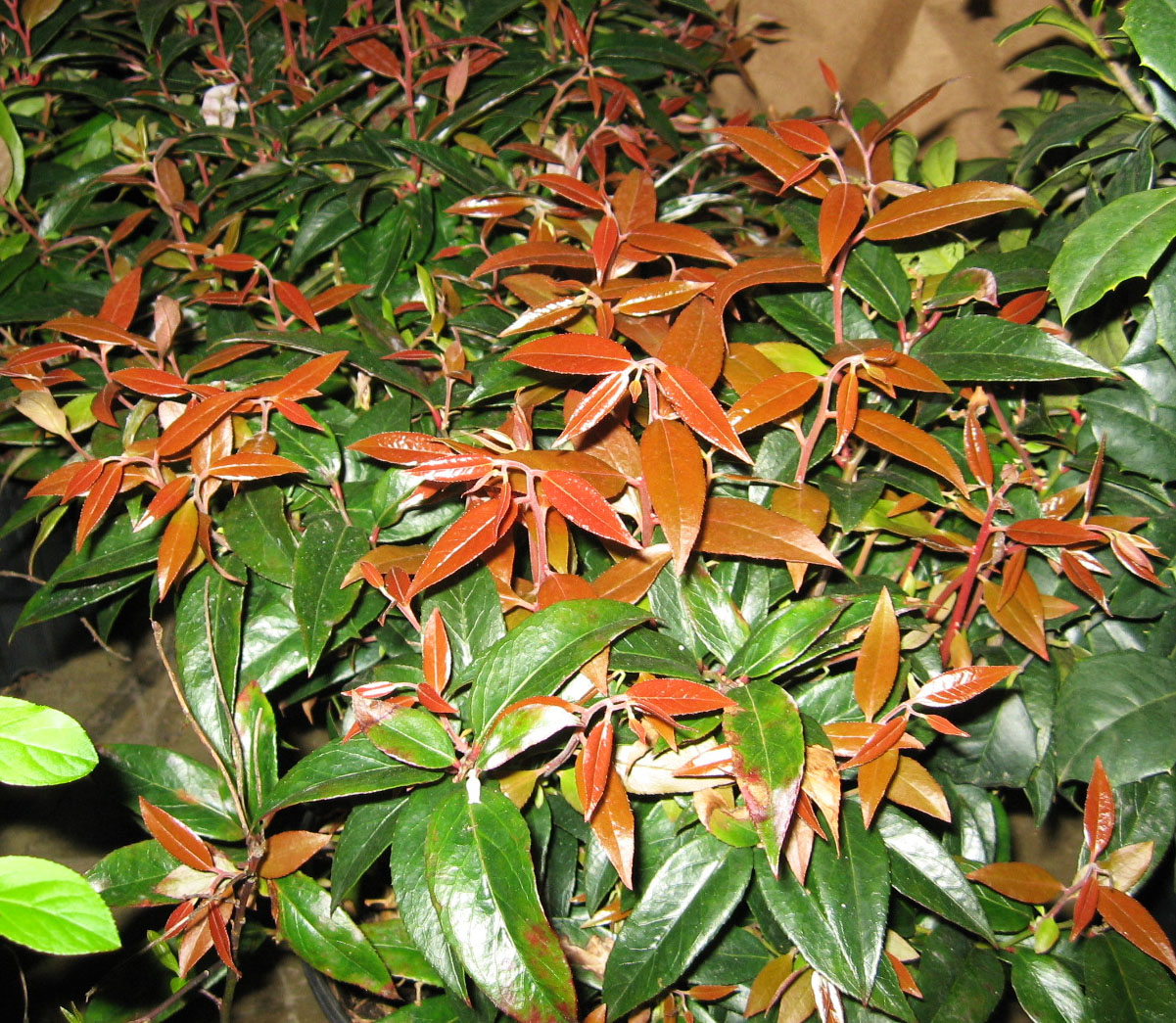
Leucothoe axillaris is native to the southeastern United States
