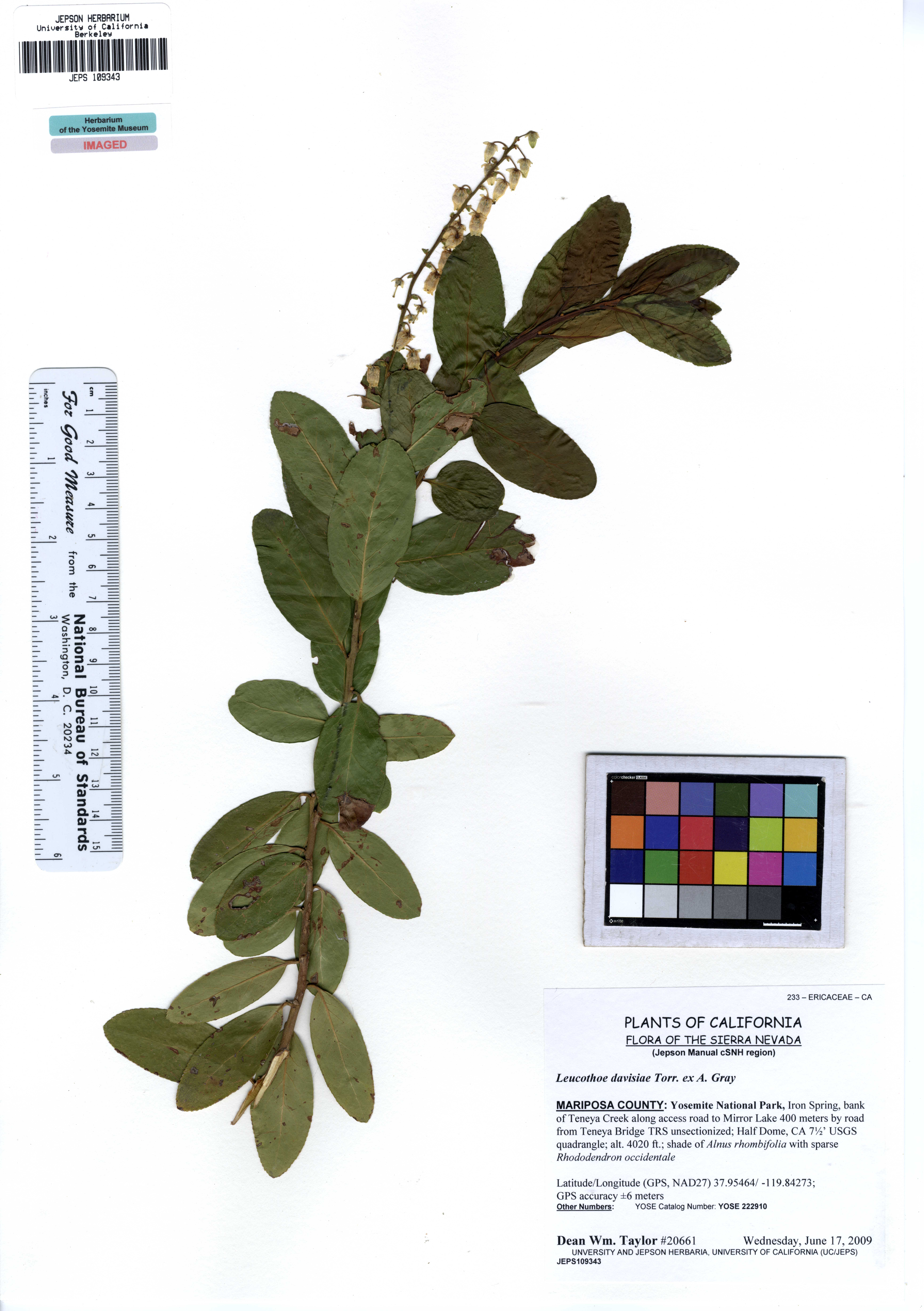

Scientific classification
- Kingdom: Plantae
- Clade: Tracheophytes
- Clade: Angiosperms
- Clade: Eudicots
- Clade: Asterids
- Order: Ericales
- Family: Ericaceae
- Genus: Leucothoe
- Species: L. davisiae

Binomial name
- Leucothoe davisiae Torr. ex A.Gray

= Leucothoe davisiae =

Species of flowering plant

Leucothoe davisiae is a species of flowering plant in the family Ericaceae known by the common name Sierra laurel.

It is native to California in the Sierra Nevada and the Klamath Mountains, in which its distribution extends just into southwestern Oregon.

== Description ==
Leucothoe davisiae is a shrub growing in wet mountain habitat, such as bogs. This shrub grows erect, exceeding one meter in height. Its leathery, hairless oval leaves are 1 to 6 centimeters long and evergreen.

The inflorescence is a hanging cluster of many small urn-shaped white flowers, not unlike those of manzanitas. The bloom period is June to August.

The fruit is a capsule about half a centimeter long containing many tiny winged seeds.
