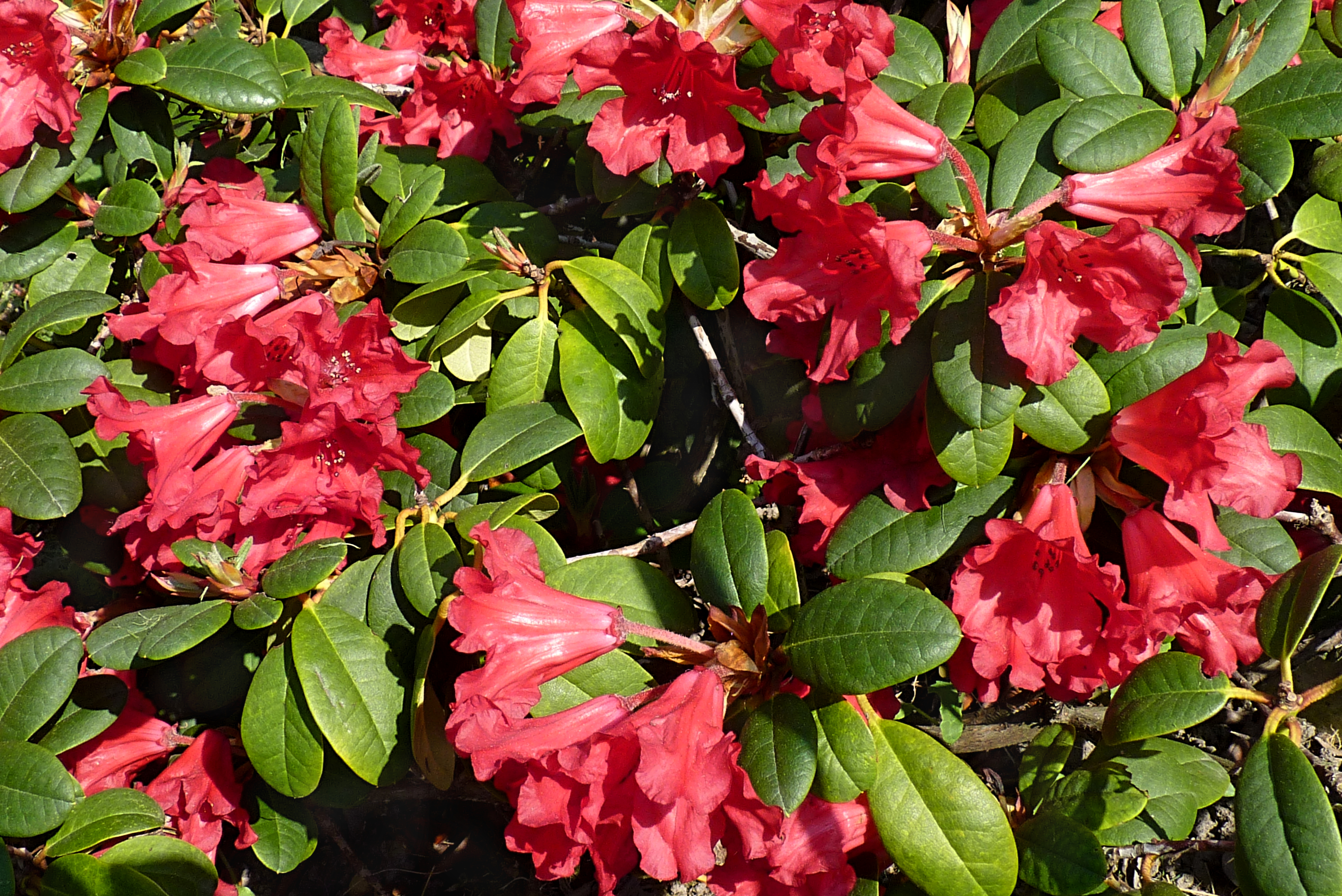
- 'Bad Eilsen' cultivar

Scientific classification
- Kingdom: Plantae
- Clade: Tracheophytes
- Clade: Angiosperms
- Clade: Eudicots
- Clade: Asterids
- Order: Ericales
- Family: Ericaceae
- Genus: Rhododendron
- Subgenus: Rhododendron subg. Hymenanthes
- Species: R. forrestii

Binomial name
- Rhododendron forrestii Balf. f. ex Diels

Subspecies
- Rhododendron forrestii subsp. forrestii; Rhododendron forrestii subsp. papillatum D.F.Chamb.

Synonyms
- Rhododendron repens Balf.f. & Forrest; Rhododendron forrestii var. repens (Balf.f. & Forrest) Cowan & Davidian; Rhododendron forrestii var. tumescens Cowan & Davidian

= Rhododendron forrestii =

Species of plant

Rhododendron forrestii (Chinese: 紫背杜鹃) is a species of dwarf creeping shrub in the heath family Ericaceae. It is native to the high-altitude regions of southwestern China and northeastern Myanmar. The species was first collected by plant hunter George Forrest in 1905 and was formally described by German botanist Ludwig Diels in 1912.

== History ==
In 1905, George Forrest collected this climbing shrub with deep crimson flowers on moist, moss-covered rocks on the Mekong–Salween divide at the border of Yunnan and Tibet. The type specimen number is Forrest No. 699. In 1912, Diels provided the first formal Latin description for the species in Notes from the Royal Botanic Garden, Edinburgh, naming it Rhododendron forrestii. In 1919, Balfour and Forrest described a new species, Rhododendron repens.

However, in 1930, Otto Stapf examined these specimens in detail for Curtis's Botanical Magazine and questioned Balfour's view of them as distinct species. Stapf argued that the presence or absence of anthocyanin on the leaf underside was merely intraspecific variation and a juvenile trait. Regarding Balfour's theory, Stapf gave the following evaluation:

To me, the evidence adduced in favour of this theory appears too slender to separate specifically forms which, in all other respects, are alike within the limits of ordinary fluctuation.

Stapf further noted that the "minor marks of difference" cited by Balfour break down upon closer inspection, and that the ratio of glandular to eglandular hairs on the ovary is highly variable. He therefore advocated merging R. repens into R. forrestii. In 1951, Cowan and Davidian reduced it to a variety, R. forrestii var. repens. Plants of the World Online and the English edition of Flora of China both accept R. forrestii as a distinct species and treat the aforementioned names as synonyms.

== Description ==
Illustrated by Lilian Snelling

Rhododendron forrestii is a low creeping shrub with gnarled woody stems and an ivy-like habit, attaching to steep cliffs and boulders by roots on the underside of its stems. Its annual growth in the wild is only about 1 cm, reaching up to 2.5 cm under cultivation. The leaves are clustered at the ends of the branches, leathery, broadly oblong to elliptic, with an obtuse or cuneate base and more or less rounded apexes, a minute brownish mucro, 0.8 to 2.5 cm long and 0.5 to 1.7 cm wide, with cartilaginous, slightly recurved margins; the adaxial surface is dark green, and the abaxial surface is pale glaucous-green, often faintly flushed with purple to dark purple, with shortly stalked red capitate glands on the midrib and lateral veins, and often a fine, early disappearing indumentum. Forrest described it during collection as "a most interesting shrub, with large fleshy flowers of a deep crimson shade. It has the habit of ivy; attached by roots on the undersurface of its stems, it covers almost perpendicular cliffs and boulders with its bullate glossy foliage. The leaves are very small, broadly ovate and highly coloured; the blooms pendulous, produced singly in the axils".

The flowers are terminal, solitary or in clusters of 2 to 3 on a branch. The pedicel is up to 2.5 cm long and densely glandular; the calyx is saucer-shaped with 5 shallow lobes, the lobes being low, thin, red, and gland-fringed on the margins; the corolla is tubular-campanulate, deep crimson, 3 to 3.8 cm long, with 5 rounded lobes; there are 10 stamens, the filaments are white, tinged with crimson at the slightly thickened base, and the anthers are dark brown; the ovary is conical and densely covered with short white glands, and the style is glabrous. The capsule is 2.5 cm long and 0.5 cm wide, densely bristly or warty, supported by the persistent calyx. The original description of the type specimen records its corolla as deep crimson, with a tube about 2 cm long.

The species is distributed in southeastern Tibet and northwestern Yunnan in China, as well as northeastern Myanmar. It grows on moist stony pastures, rocky slopes, and cliffs at elevations of 3000 to 4500 meters. In its native habitat, it is covered by snow for up to seven months of the year and is often shrouded in rain and moist mist the rest of the time. Therefore, it requires a semi-shaded, cool, and highly humid environment for cultivation, and is best planted in well-aerated soil mixed with peat, leaf mold, a small amount of clay, and coarse sand.

== Tissue culture and micropropagation ==
Researchers have explored methods for rapid in vitro propagation using tissue culture techniques. A 1998 study evaluated the effects of different concentrations and types of cytokinins (including zeatin, isopentenyladenine, kinetin, and benzylaminopurine and their riboside forms) on axillary shoot formation. The results showed that adding 2.0 mg/L of benzylaminopurine or 2.0 mg/L of isopentenyladenine riboside combined with 20 g/L sucrose to the medium resulted in the best axillary shoot proliferation, while kinetin and kinetin riboside had the poorest effect.

== Conservation status ==
The IUCN Red List of Threatened Species has not yet assessed Rhododendron forrestii. In The Red List of Rhododendrons published by Botanic Gardens Conservation International in 2011, the species was assessed separately by subspecies: R. forrestii subsp. forrestii is listed as Least Concern, while R. forrestii subsp. papillatum is listed as Vulnerable with a very small range (VU D2).
