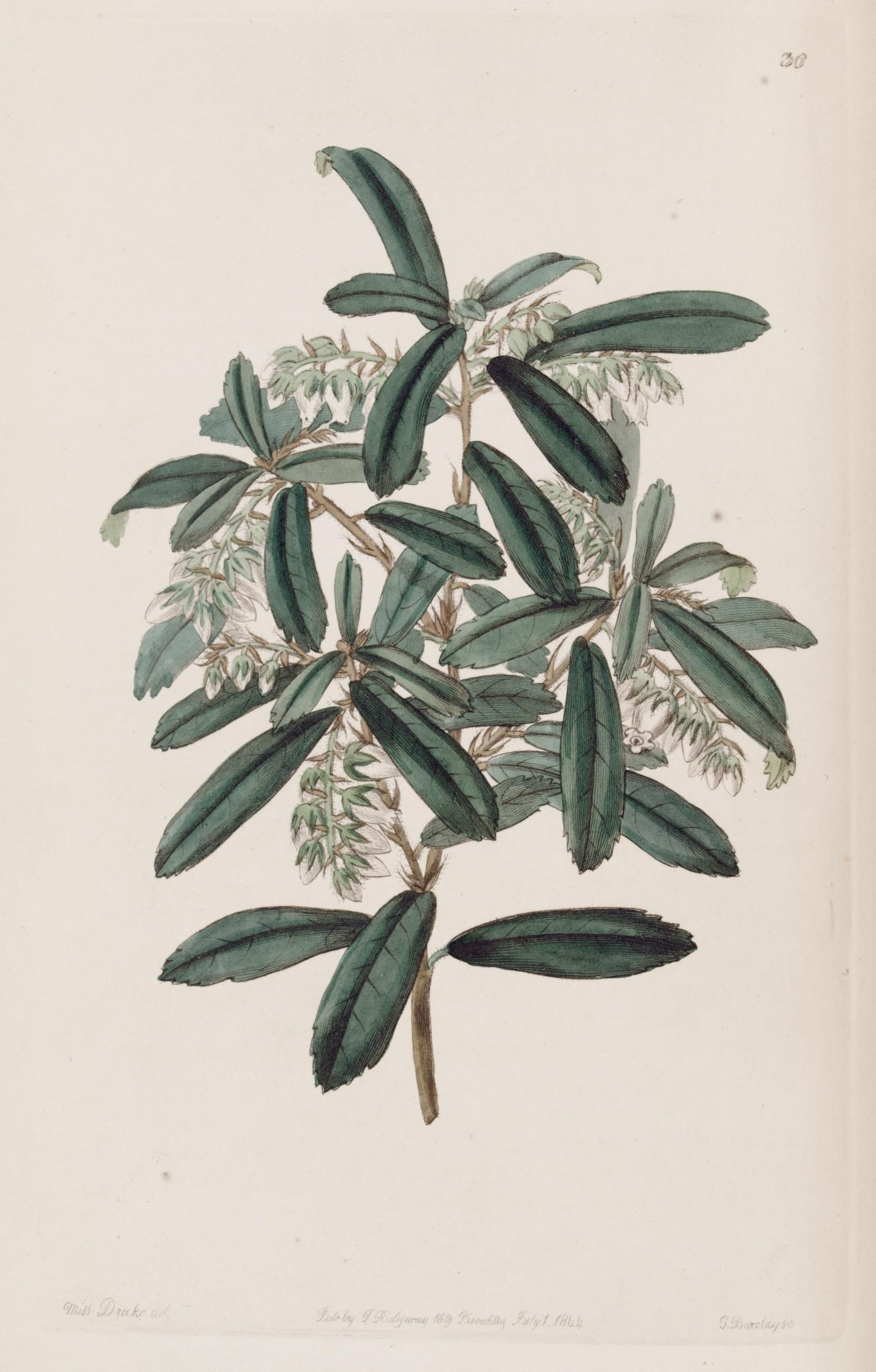

Scientific classification
- Kingdom: Plantae
- Clade: Embryophytes
- Clade: Tracheophytes
- Clade: Angiosperms
- Clade: Eudicots
- Clade: Asterids
- Order: Ericales
- Family: Ericaceae
- Genus: Pieris
- Species: P. phillyreifolia

Binomial name
- Pieris phillyreifolia (Hook.) DC. (1839)

Synonyms
- Ampelothamnus phillyreifolius (Hook.) (1913); Andromeda phillyreifolia Hook. (1837)

= Pieris phillyreifolia =

Species of flowering plant

Pieris phillyreifolia, commonly known as the climbing fetterbush or vine wicky, is a shrubby vine. An evergreen perennial in the Ericaceae family, it has white flowers. It grows in the southeastern United States. It is a dicot in the Pieris genus.
