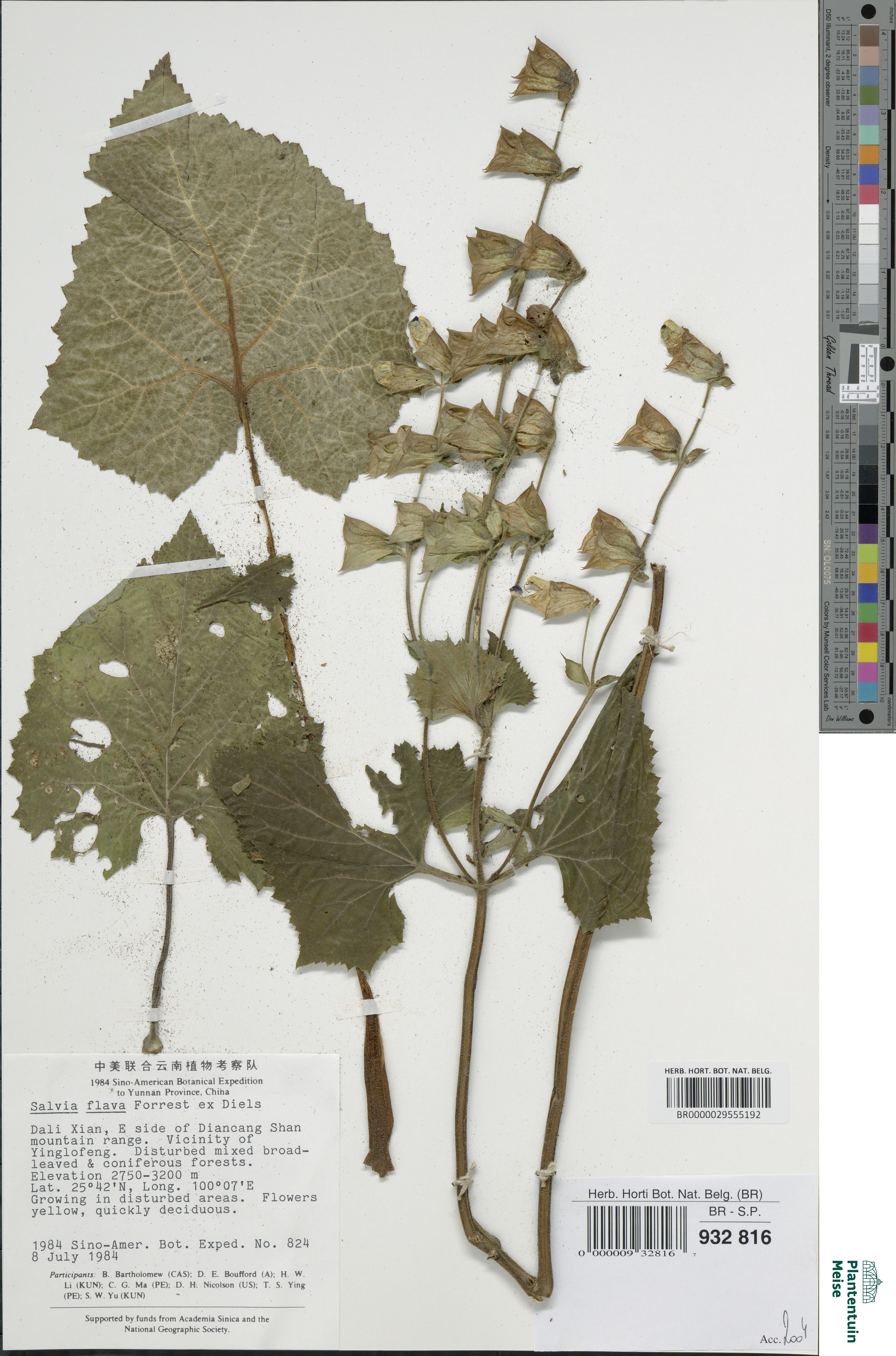

Scientific classification
- Kingdom: Plantae
- Clade: Tracheophytes
- Clade: Angiosperms
- Clade: Eudicots
- Clade: Asterids
- Order: Lamiales
- Family: Lamiaceae
- Genus: Salvia
- Species: S. flava

Binomial name
- Salvia flava Forrest ex Diels

= Salvia flava =

Species of shrub

Salvia flava is a herbaceous perennial shrub native to Yunnan province in China, growing in large numbers at 7,500-13,000 ft elevation. It grows on hillsides and along streambanks in gravelly soil with maples, willows, viburnum, berberis, and clematis.

It grows over 2 ft tall with rich grassy green leaves that are about 3 in long with a puckered surface and pointed tip. In summer the flower stalk grows to 2 ft long, with yellow to yellow-brown flowers with a purple spot on the lower lip. The tubular shaped flowers are in whorls of four to eight, widely spaced, with long soft hairs.

The Flora of China (1994) states that Salvia bulleyana, also found in Yunnan, is closely related to and often mistaken for S. flava, and is sometimes regarded as a synonym. In Great Britain and the U.S., S. flava is often sold as S. bulleyana. The flowers of S. bulleyana are purple-blue with no spotting.
