= Daemilus rufus =

Scientific classification
- Domain: Eukaryota
- Kingdom: Animalia
- Phylum: Arthropoda
- Class: Insecta
- Order: Lepidoptera
- Family: Tortricidae
- Genus: Daemilus
- Species: D. rufus

Binomial name
- Daemilus rufus Razowski, 2009

Species of moth

Daemilus rufus is a moth of the family Tortricidae. It is found in Vietnam.

The wingspan is 16 mm.
