= Daemilus mutuurai =

Scientific classification
- Kingdom: Animalia
- Phylum: Arthropoda
- Clade: Pancrustacea
- Class: Insecta
- Order: Lepidoptera
- Family: Tortricidae
- Genus: Daemilus
- Species: D. mutuurai

Binomial name
- Daemilus mutuurai Yasuda, 1975

Species of moth

Daemilus mutuurai is a species of moth of the family Tortricidae. It is found in Japan, where it has been recorded from Honshu.

The wingspan is 14–16 mm.
