= Daemilus =

Scientific classification
- Kingdom: Animalia
- Phylum: Arthropoda
- Clade: Pancrustacea
- Class: Insecta
- Order: Lepidoptera
- Family: Tortricidae
- Tribe: Archipini
- Genus: Daemilus; Yasuda, 1972

Genus of tortrix moths

Daemilus is a genus of moths belonging to the subfamily Tortricinae of the family Tortricidae.

== Species ==
- Daemilus fulva (Filipjev, 1962)
- Daemilus mutuurai Yasuda, 1975
- Daemilus rufapex Razowski, 2009
- Daemilus rufus Razowski, 2009

== See also ==
- List of Tortricidae genera
