= Pararuellia =

Scientific classification
- Kingdom: Plantae
- Clade: Tracheophytes
- Clade: Angiosperms
- Clade: Eudicots
- Clade: Asterids
- Order: Lamiales
- Family: Acanthaceae
- Subfamily: Acanthoideae
- Genus: Pararuellia; Bremek. & Nann.-Bremek. (1948)

Species
- 11; see text

Genus of flowering plants

Pararuellia is a genus of flowering plants in the family Acanthaceae. It includes 11 species which range from southern China to Vietnam, the Philippines, Peninsular Malaysia, Sumatra, Java, the Lesser Sunda Islands, and Maluku Islands.

== Species ==
11 species are accepted:

- Pararuellia alata H.P.Tsui
- Pararuellia cavaleriei (H.Lév.) E.Hossain
- Pararuellia delavayana (Baill.) E.Hossain
- Pararuellia flagelliformis (Roxb.) Bremek. & Nann.-Bremek.
- Pararuellia glomerata Y.M.Shui & W.H.Chen
- Pararuellia hainanensis C.Y.Wu & H.S.Lo
- Pararuellia lowei (S.Moore) Bremek. & Nann.-Bremek.
- Pararuellia napifera (Zoll.) Bremek. & Nann.-Bremek.
- Pararuellia nudispica (C.B.Clarke) Bremek. & Nann.-Bremek.
- Pararuellia poilanei (Benoist) Bremek. & Nann.-Bremek.
- Pararuellia sumatrensis (C.B.Clarke) Bremek. & Nann.-Bremek.
