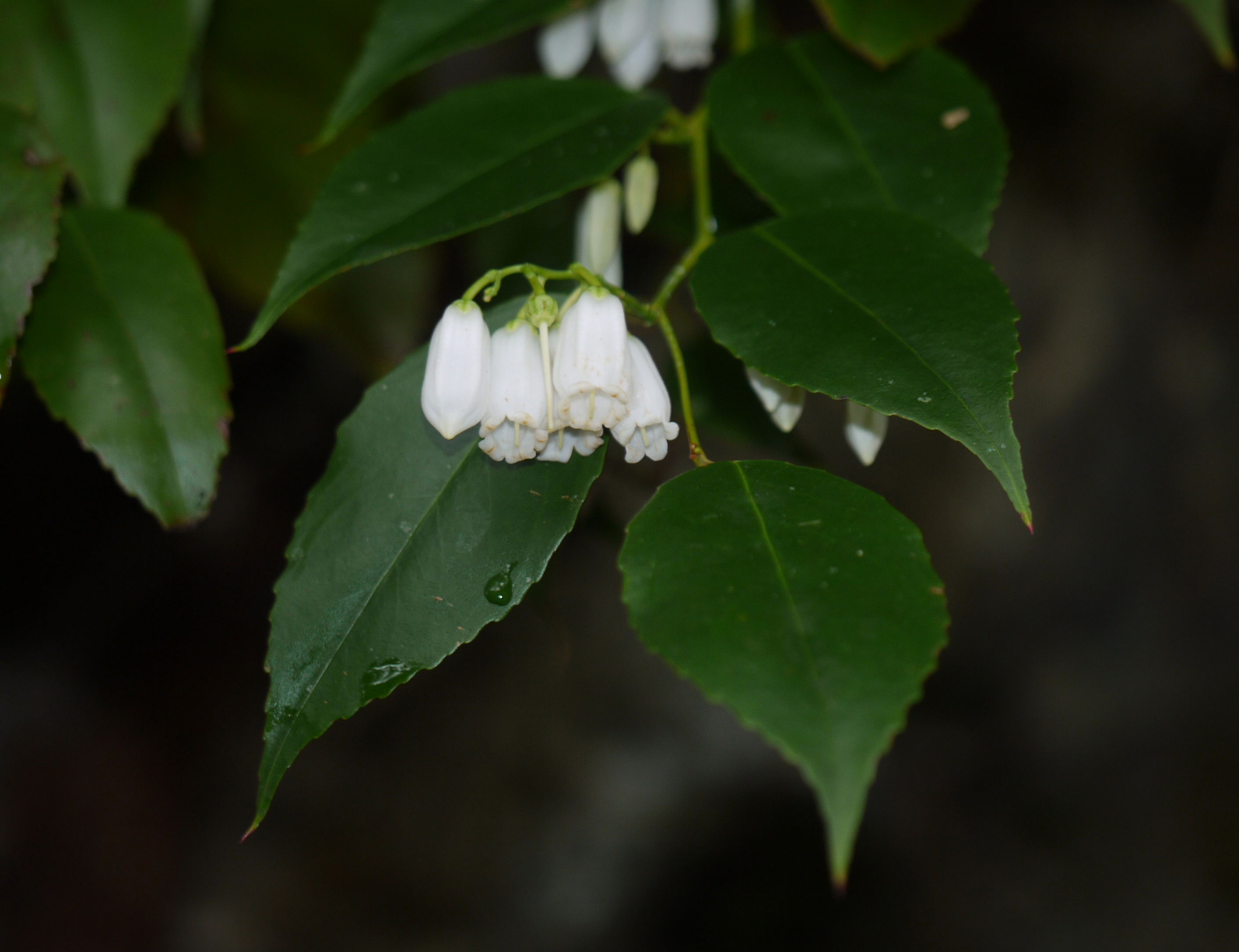
- Close-up of flowers
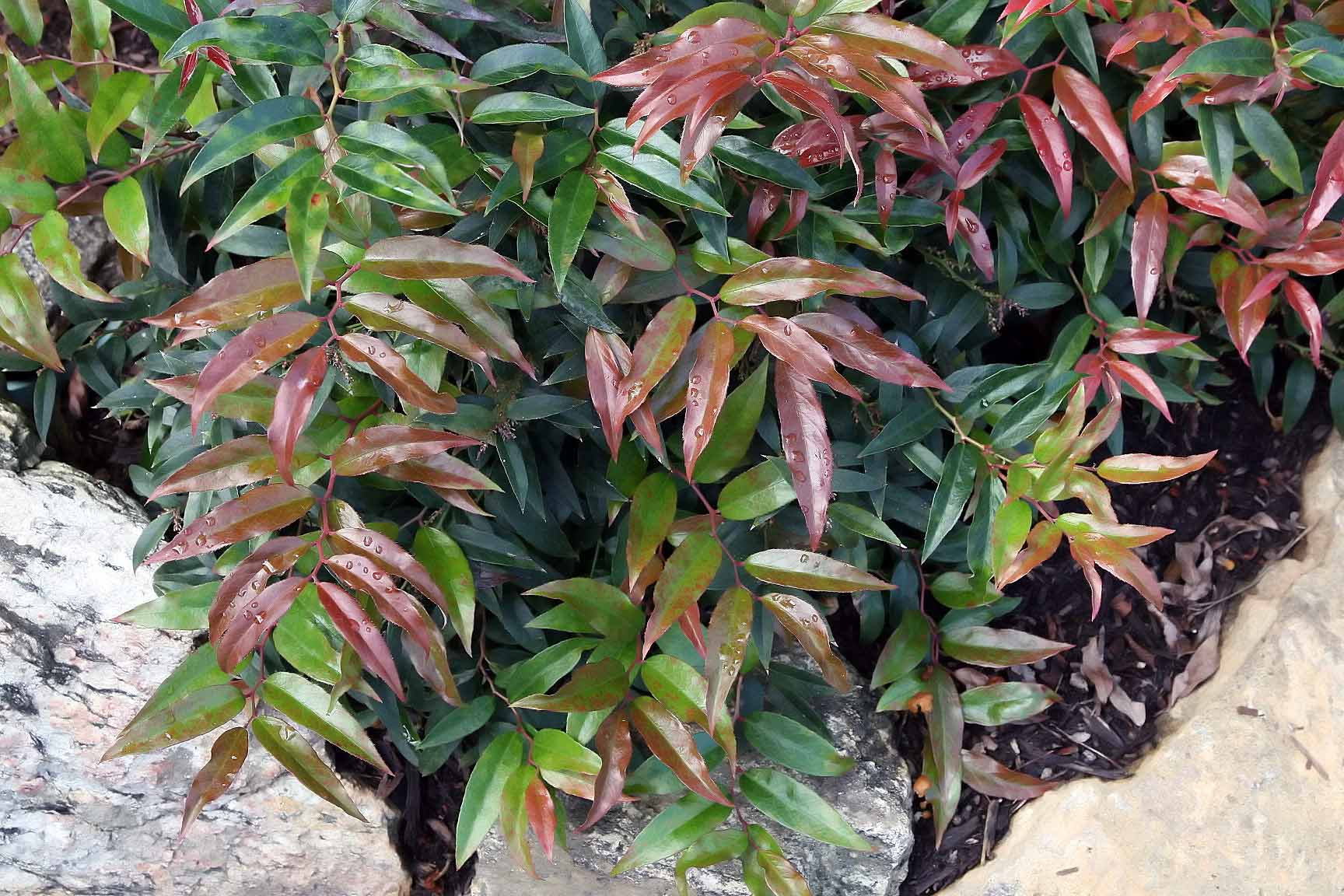
- 'Royal Ruby' cultivar

Scientific classification
- Kingdom: Plantae
- Clade: Embryophytes
- Clade: Tracheophytes
- Clade: Angiosperms
- Clade: Eudicots
- Clade: Asterids
- Order: Ericales
- Family: Ericaceae
- Genus: Leucothoe
- Species: L. keiskei

Binomial name
- Leucothoe keiskei Miq.

Synonyms
- Paraleucothoe keiskei (Miq.) Honda

= Leucothoe keiskei =

Species of flowering plant

Leucothoe keiskei, the Keskei dog hobble or Keskei fetterbush, is a species of flowering plant in the family Ericaceae, native to southern Honshu, Japan. A perennial evergreen shrub reaching 1 m (3 ft), there are a number of cultivars, including 'Royal Ruby' and 'Opstal50', trade designation Burning Love.
