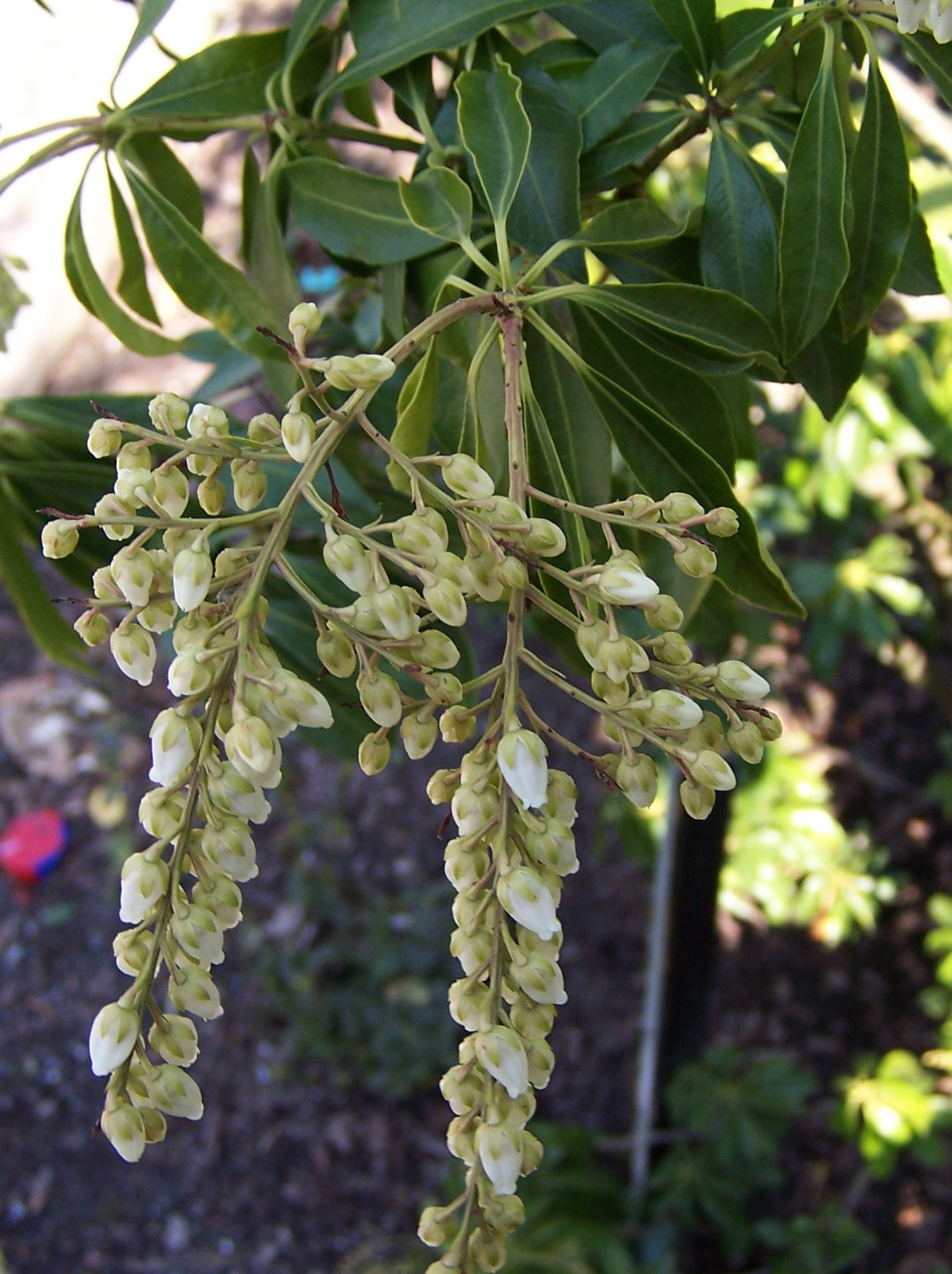
- Flower raceme in March

Scientific classification
- Kingdom: Plantae
- Clade: Tracheophytes
- Clade: Angiosperms
- Clade: Eudicots
- Clade: Asterids
- Order: Ericales
- Family: Ericaceae
- Genus: Pieris
- Species: P. floribunda

Binomial name
- Pieris floribunda Benth. & Hook.f.

Synonyms
- Andromeda floribunda Pursh 1813; Portuna floribunda (Pursh) Nutt.

= Pieris floribunda =

Species of shrub

Pieris floribunda is a North American species of broadleaf evergreen shrub, a member of the fetterbush genus in the blueberry family (Ericaceae). It is commonly known in North America as mountain fetterbush or mountain andromeda. All parts of Pieris floribunda are poisonous if ingested. In landscapes it should be grown in full to part shade, out of windy locations, and have a good quality soil with much organic matter with acidity of pH 4.5 to 6.5.

The mountain fetterbush is less subject to damage from the Azalea lacebug that often infests the related Pieris japonica.

== Description ==
Pieris floribunda is a bushy shrub growing to around 0.9 to 1.8 metres (3 to 6 ft) high with oval shiny, leathery leaves which are normally evergreen, but may shed in a harsh winter to brown and persist until spring. It has erect or erect with just slightly nodding panicles of white urn-shaped flowers that form in autumn as erect pink buds. The brown, dry fruit is a slightly angled globular capsule about 10 millimetres (1/2 in) long in autumn and persisting until late April. The gray-brown bark is shaggy and peeling when mature.

== Distribution ==
Pieris floribunda is native to the eastern United States, primarily the southern Appalachian Mountains in the States of Tennessee, North and South Carolina, Georgia, Virginia and West Virginia. It thrives in areas of land disturbed by human activity. In common with other members of Pieris, it grows better on well drained soils.

== Cultivars ==
There is a cultivar of a hybrid between the American and Japanese species called 'Brouwer's Beauty' that does adapt easily to cultivation and bears intermediate flower clusters that are erect and yet drooping also.
