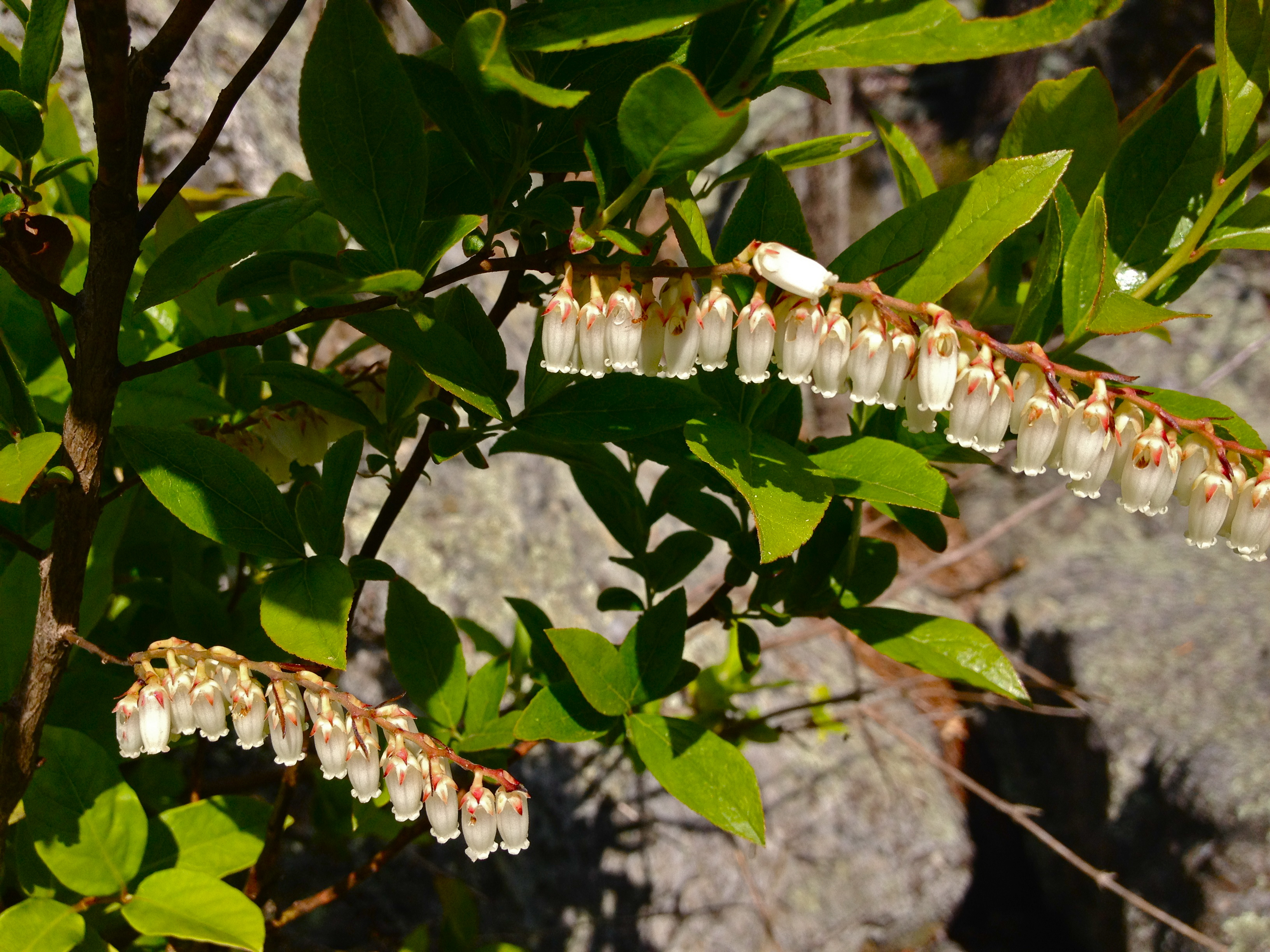
- Eubotrys racemosus

Scientific classification
- Kingdom: Plantae
- Clade: Tracheophytes
- Clade: Angiosperms
- Clade: Eudicots
- Clade: Asterids
- Order: Ericales
- Family: Ericaceae
- Subfamily: Vaccinioideae
- Tribe: Gaultherieae
- Genus: Eubotrys; Nutt.

= Eubotrys =

Genus of flowering plants

Eubotrys is a genus of plants in the family Ericaceae. Currently accepted species include:

- Eubotrys racemosus (L.) Nutt.
- Eubotrys recurvus (Buckley) Britton
