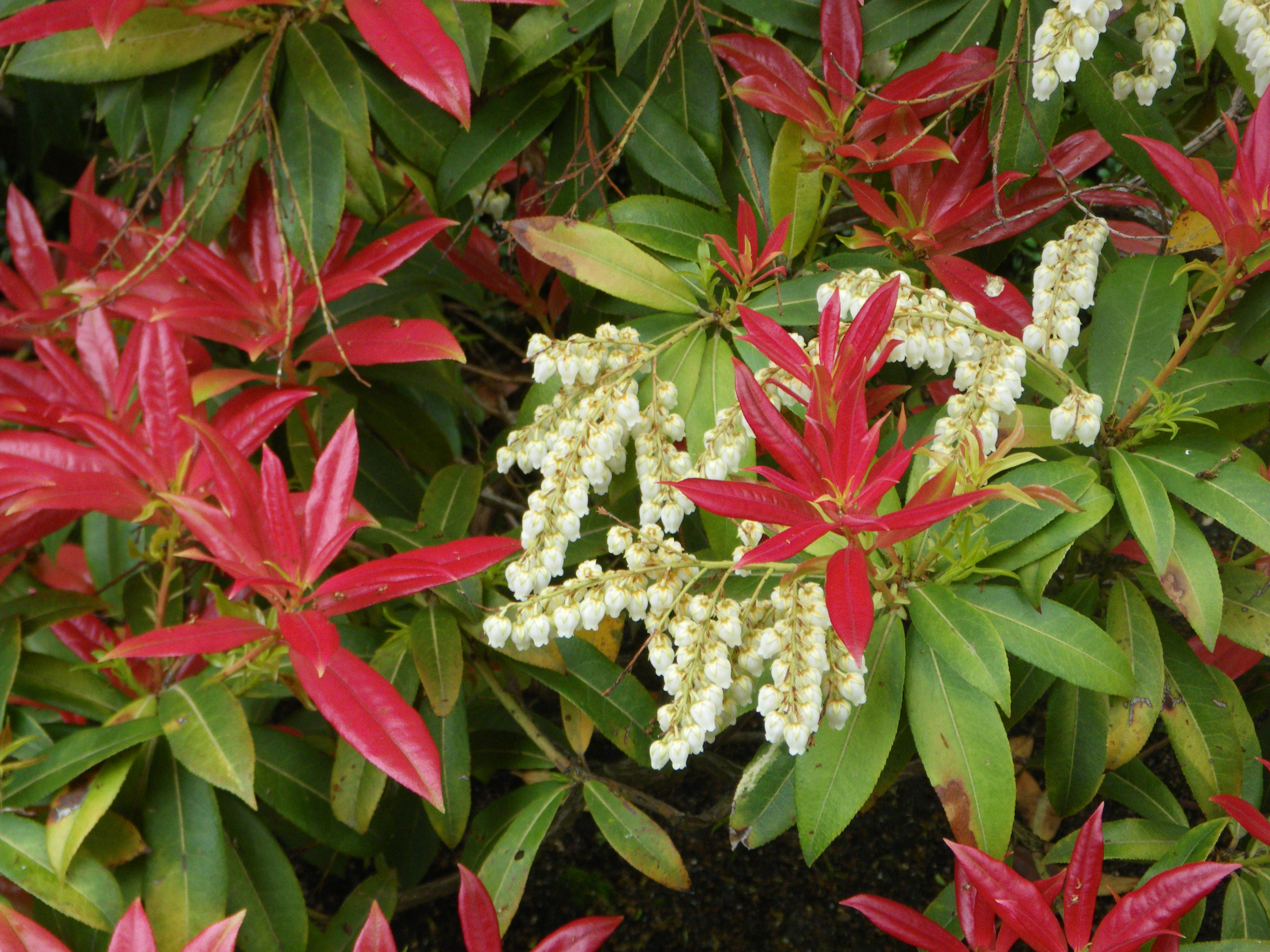
- Pieris formosa 'Wakehurst'

Scientific classification
- Kingdom: Plantae
- Clade: Embryophytes
- Clade: Tracheophytes
- Clade: Angiosperms
- Clade: Eudicots
- Clade: Asterids
- Order: Ericales
- Family: Ericaceae
- Genus: Pieris
- Species: P. formosa

Binomial name
- Pieris formosa (Wall.) D.Don

Synonyms
- List: Andromeda formosa Wall.; Comarostaphylis formosa (Wall.) Lem.; Lyonia formosa (Wall.) Hand.-Mazz.; Pieris bodinieri H.Lév.; Pieris forrestii R.L.Harrow ex W.W.Sm; Pieris huiana W.P.Fang; Pieris japonica subsp. formosa (Wall.) Kitam.

= Pieris formosa =

Species of flowering plant

Pieris formosa, called the Taiwan pieris or the Himalayan andromeda, is a species of flowering plant in the genus Pieris native to Nepal, the eastern Himalaya, Assam in India, Myanmar, Vietnam, Tibet, central and southern China, but not Taiwan. The 'Wakehurst' cultivar of the variety Pieris formosa var. forrestii has gained the Royal Horticultural Society's Award of Garden Merit as an ornamental, and is also considered by them as a good plant to attract pollinators. A vigorous evergreen shrub to 4 m (13 ft) in height, its leaves open red in early spring, turning green later. The trusses of creamy white flowers open at the same time as the young leaves. Like all pieris, it prefers a partially shaded spot in acid pH soil.
