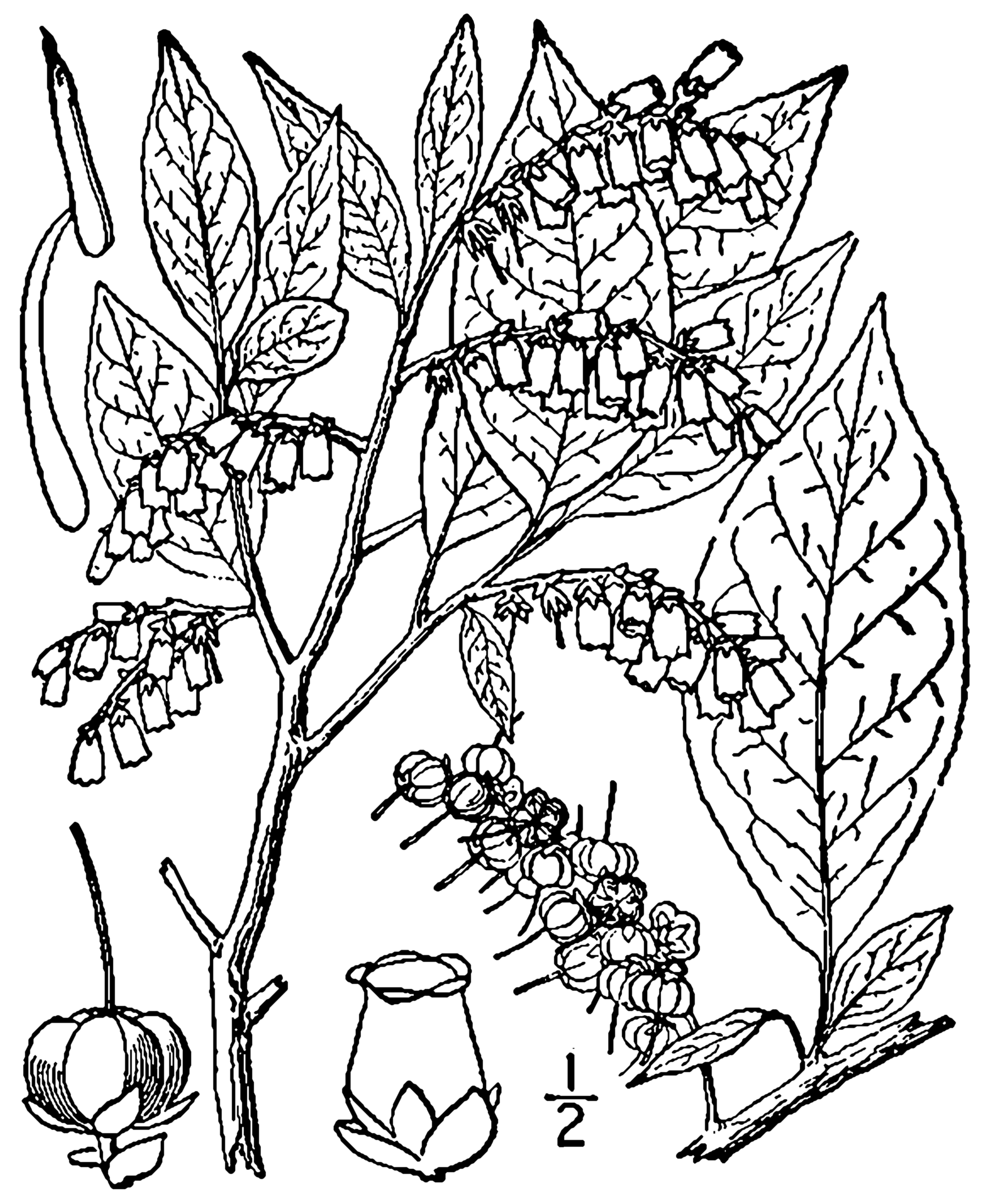

Conservation status
- Apparently Secure (NatureServe)

Scientific classification
- Kingdom: Plantae
- Clade: Tracheophytes
- Clade: Angiosperms
- Clade: Eudicots
- Clade: Asterids
- Order: Ericales
- Family: Ericaceae
- Genus: Eubotrys
- Species: E. recurvus

Binomial name
- Eubotrys recurvus (Buckley) Britton

Synonyms
- Andromeda recurva Buckley; Leucothoe recurva (Buckley) A. Gray

= Eubotrys recurvus =

Species of flowering plant

Eubotrys recurvus is a plant species native to the Eastern United States. Common names include deciduous mountain fetterbush and red-twig doghobble.

== Distribution and habitat ==
The plant grows in moist forests, bogs, granitic domes, etc., at elevations up to 1,500 m (4,900 ft). It has been reported from Alabama, Georgia, North and South Carolina, Tennessee, Kentucky, Ohio, Virginia, West Virginia and New York State.

== Description ==
Eubotrys recurvus is a branching shrub up to 4 m (13 ft) tall. Leaves are up to 8 cm (3.1 in) long. Flowers are campanulate, white to pale pink. Fruit is a dry capsule.

== See also ==
- Eubotrys racemosus
