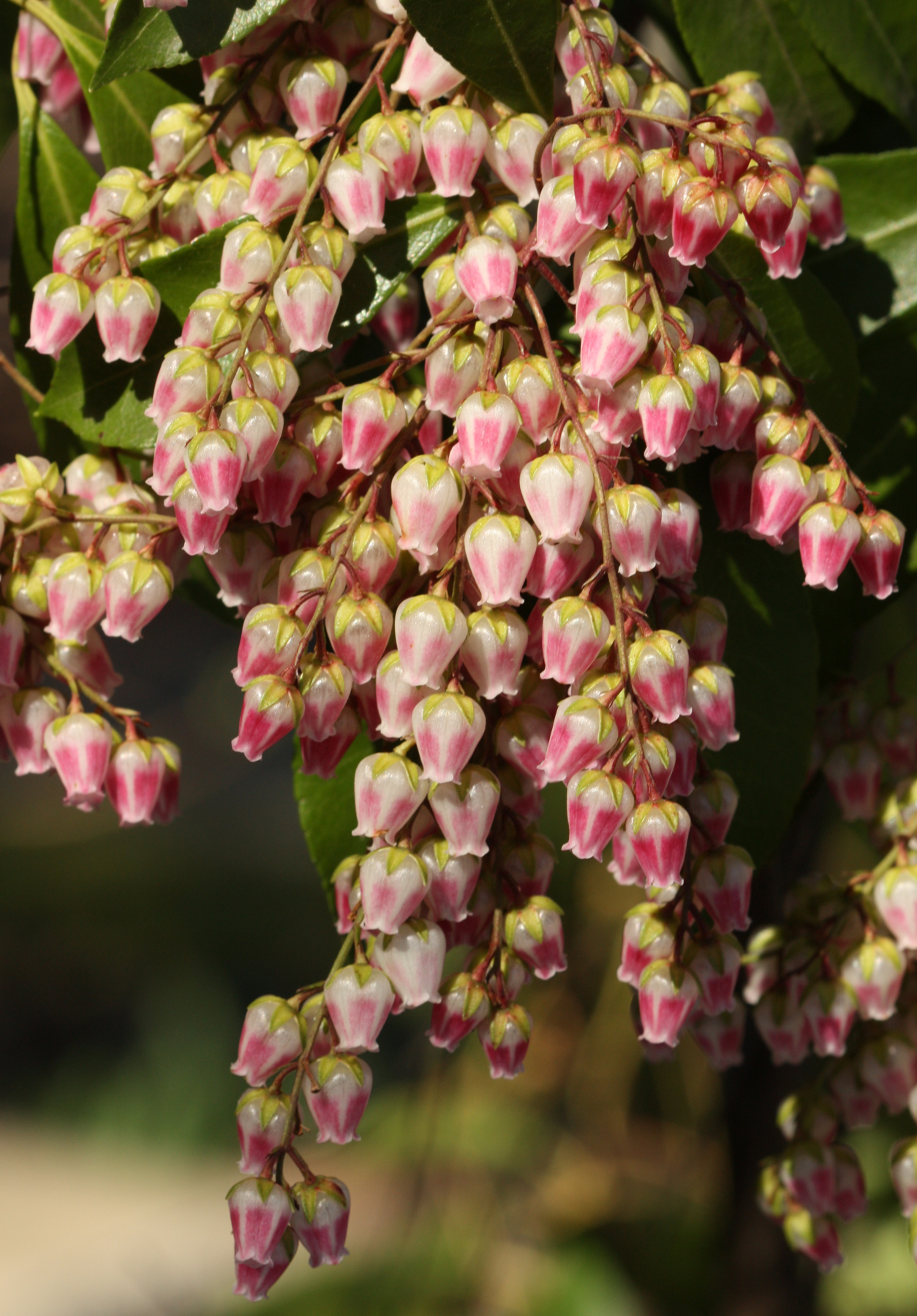
- Pieris japonica

Scientific classification
- Kingdom: Plantae
- Clade: Embryophytes
- Clade: Tracheophytes
- Clade: Angiosperms
- Clade: Eudicots
- Clade: Asterids
- Order: Ericales
- Family: Ericaceae
- Subfamily: Vaccinioideae
- Tribe: Lyonieae
- Genus: Pieris; D.Don

= Pieris (plant) =

Genus of flowering plants in the heath family

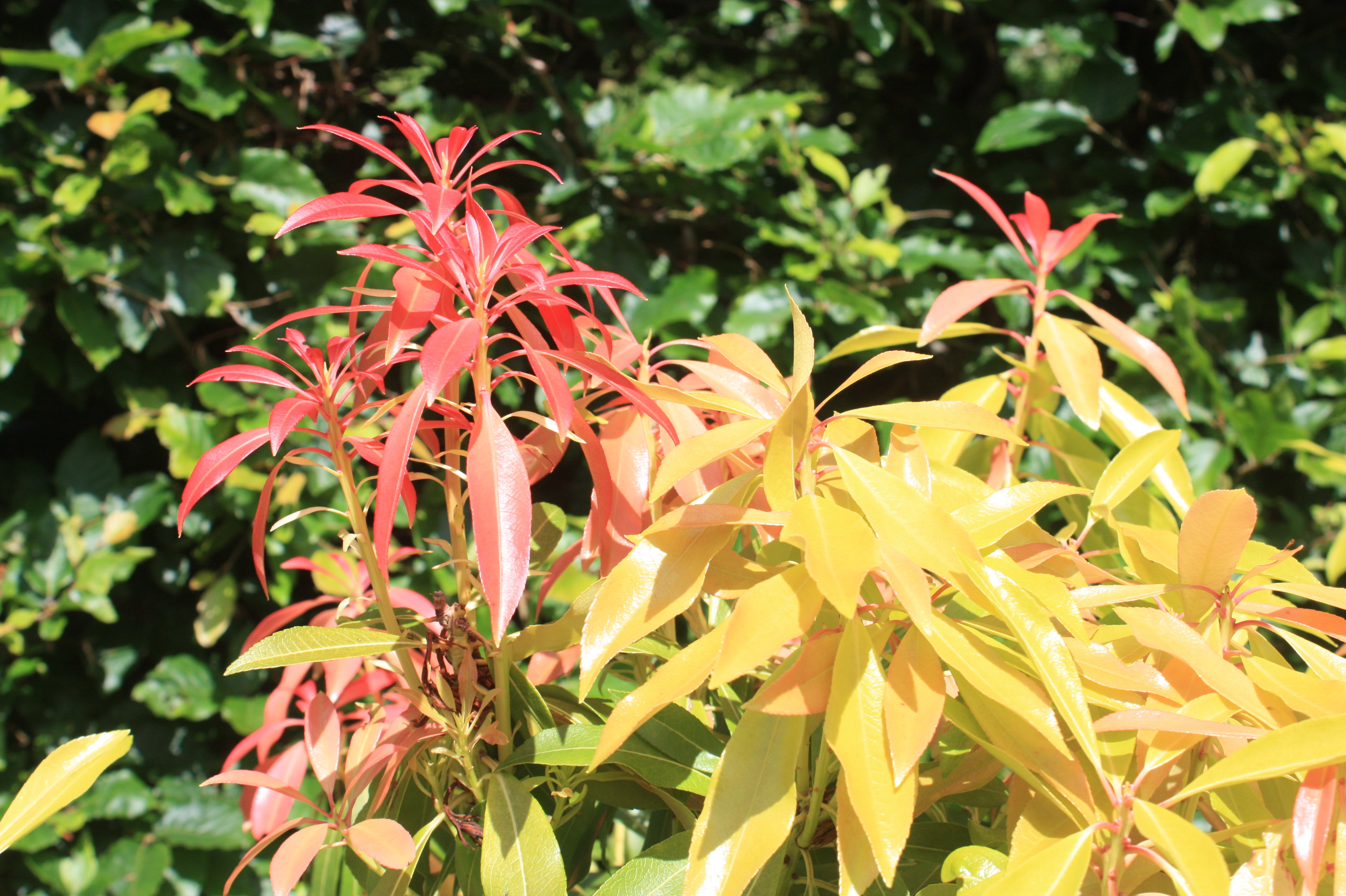
Late spring foliage on Pieris

Pieris (/ˈpaɪ.ərɪs/ or /ˈpɪərɪs/) is a genus of seven species of shrubs in the flowering plant family Ericaceae, native to mountain regions of eastern and southern Asia, eastern North America and Cuba. Known commonly in North America as andromedas or fetterbushes, they are broad-leaved evergreen shrubs growing to 1–6 metres (3–20 ft) tall and 0.9–3.0 m (3–10 ft) wide. The leaves are spirally arranged, often appearing to be in whorls at the end of each shoot with bare stretches of shoot below; they are lanceolate-ovate, 2–10 cm (1–4 in) long and 1.0–3.5 cm (1/2–1 1/2 in) broad, leathery textured, and with an entire or serrated margin. The young leaves in spring are typically brightly coloured. The flowers, which may have a very appealing honey scent, are bell-shaped, 5–15 mm (3/16–9/16 in) long, white or pink, and arranged in racemes 5–12 cm (2–4 1/2 in) long. The fruit is a woody capsule which splits into five sections to release the numerous small seeds.

Pieris species are used as food plants by the larvae of some Lepidoptera species including the engrailed.

The genus name derives from Pieria, a place in Greece, according to Greek mythology the home of the Muses.

== Species ==
- Pieris cubensis (Grisebach) Small. Western Cuba.
- Pieris floribunda (Pursh ex Simms) Benth. & Hook. – mountain andromeda, mountain pieris, mountain fetterbush. Eastern United States.
- Pieris formosa (Wallich) D.Don – Chinese pieris, Himalayan pieris. The Himalaya, southwestern China (Yunnan), northern Myanmar.
- Pieris japonica (Thunb.) D.Don ex G.Don – Japanese andromeda. Eastern China, Japan, Taiwan.
- Pieris nana (Maxim.) Makino (syn. Arcterica nana). Japan, eastern Siberia.
- Pieris phillyreifolia (Hook.) DC. – climbing fetterbush. Southeastern United States.
- Pieris swinhoei Hemsley – southeastern China (Fujian, Guangdong).

== Cultivation ==
They are commonly grown as ornamental plants, valued for year-round interest due to bright red new growth in early spring, chains of small, white flowers in mid-spring, and buds that remain on the plant through the winter. Numerous cultivars have been selected for different spring foliage colour. They grow best in a shady spot, sheltered from drying, winter winds. They prefer acidic soil, and should be mulched once per year, using a two-inch covering of either peat or composted pine needles. The flowers give the plant one of its alternative names, 'Lily of the valley shrub' (though Pieris is not closely related to Convallaria).

== Cultivars ==
The following cultivars have gained the Royal Horticultural Society's Award of Garden Merit:-

- 'Blush'
- 'Cavatine'
- 'Debutante'
- 'Firecrest'
- 'Flaming silver'
- 'Forest flame'
- 'Mountain fire'
- 'Pink delight'
- 'Prelude'
- 'Purity'
- 'Sarabande'
- 'Valley Valentine'
- 'Wakehurst'

== Toxicity ==
Pieris floribunda (mountain fetterbush) has been noted as highly toxic.
