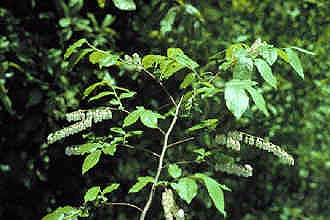

Conservation status
- Secure (NatureServe)

Scientific classification
- Kingdom: Plantae
- Clade: Tracheophytes
- Clade: Angiosperms
- Clade: Eudicots
- Clade: Asterids
- Order: Ericales
- Family: Ericaceae
- Genus: Eubotrys
- Species: E. racemosus

Binomial name
- Eubotrys racemosus (L.) Nutt.

Synonyms
- Eubotrys elongata; Leucothoe elongata; Leucothoe racemosa

= Eubotrys racemosus =

Species of flowering plant

Eubotrys racemosus (syn. Leucothoe racemosa) is a species of flowering plant in the heath family known by the common names fetterbush, swamp doghobble, coastal fetterbush, and swamp sweetbells.

It is native to the Eastern United States, where its distribution extends along the coastal plain from Massachusetts to Florida to Texas.

== Description ==
Eubotrys racemosa is a shrub growing up to 4 metres (13 ft) tall. The thin, smooth leaves have oval to widely lance-shaped blades with serrated margins. The leaves are 3 to 8 centimetres (1.2 to 3.1 in) long, with small and larger leaves occurring together on a branch. The leaves are deciduous.

The inflorescence is a row of bell-shaped white flowers each just under a centimetre long. The fruit is a capsule.

== Habitats ==
This shrub grows in coastal plain habitat among pines such as loblolly, slash, and shortleaf pines, and oak species. It occurs in several habitat types including savanna, forest, bog, and pocosin. The climate is mild in the winter and hot and humid in the summer. It is not tolerant of shade and is usually found in full sunlight. It can be found growing with swamp blackgum (Nyssa sylvatica var. biflora), loblolly bay (Gordonia lasianthus), sweetbay (Persea borbonia), red maple (Acer rubrum), titi (Cyrilla racemiflora), southern white cedar (Chamaecyparis thyoides), hurrahbush (Lyonia lucida), sweet pepperbush (Clethra alnifolia), southern bayberry (Myrica cerifera), and laurelleaf greenbrier (Smilax laurifolia).

The leaves of this plant are poisonous to livestock.

== See also ==
- Eubotrys recurvus
