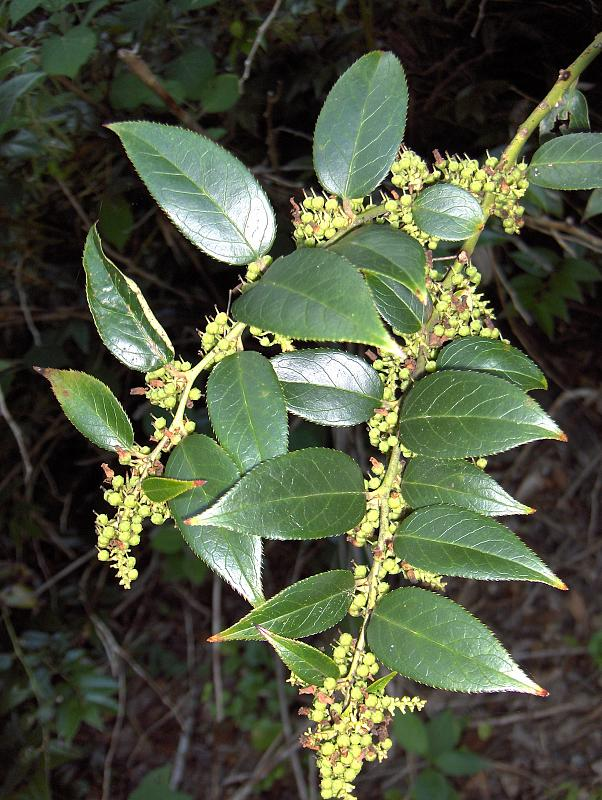

Scientific classification
- Kingdom: Plantae
- Clade: Tracheophytes
- Clade: Angiosperms
- Clade: Eudicots
- Clade: Asterids
- Order: Ericales
- Family: Ericaceae
- Genus: Leucothoe
- Species: L. fontanesiana

Binomial name
- Leucothoe fontanesiana (Steud.) Sleumer

= Leucothoe fontanesiana =

Species of flowering plant

Leucothoe fontanesiana, also known as the highland doghobble, fetter-bush, mountain doghobble or switch ivy, is a species of flowering plant in the family Ericaceae, native to the southeastern United States. It is an erect evergreen shrub growing to 1–2 m (3–7 ft) tall by 3 m (10 ft) broad, with laurel-like glossy leaves 6–16 cm (2–6 in) long, and pendent axillary racemes of urn-shaped flowers in spring.

This plant is a calcifuge and requires a shaded position in acid soil. The cultivar 'Rollissonii' has gained the Royal Horticultural Society's Award of Garden Merit.

L. fontanesiana has been marked as a pollinator plant, supporting and attracting bees and butterflies
