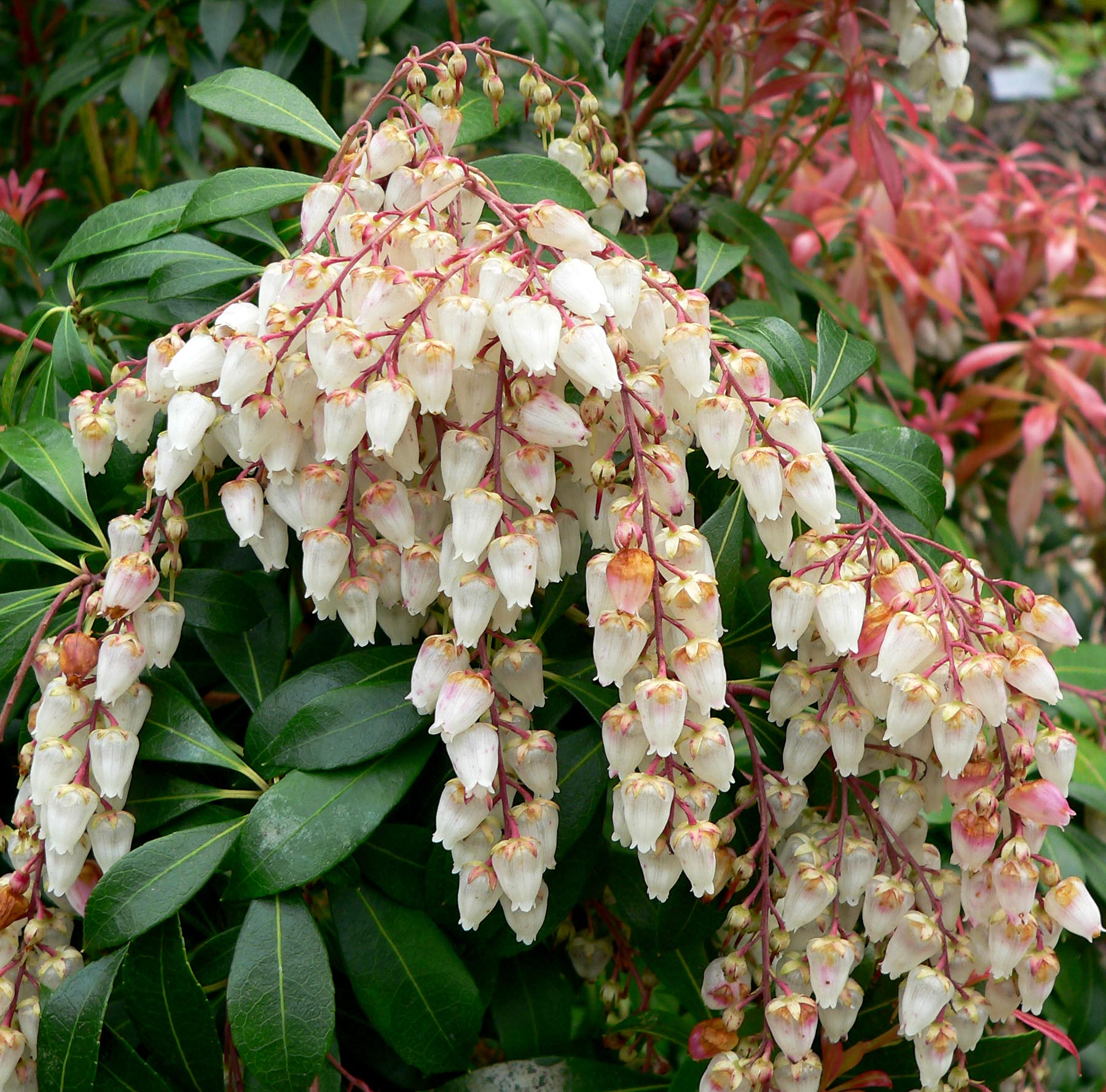
- Inflorescence

Scientific classification
- Kingdom: Plantae
- Clade: Tracheophytes
- Clade: Angiosperms
- Clade: Eudicots
- Clade: Asterids
- Order: Ericales
- Family: Ericaceae
- Genus: Pieris
- Species: P. japonica

Binomial name
- Pieris japonica (Thunb.) D. Don ex G. Don

Synonyms
- Andromeda japonica Thunb. L.

= Pieris japonica =

Species of flowering plant

Pieris japonica, the Japanese andromeda or Japanese pieris, is a species of flowering plant in the heath family Ericaceae. It is native to eastern China, Taiwan, and Japan, where it grows in mountain thickets. This medium-sized evergreen shrub or tree is widely cultivated in gardens.

== Description ==
It grows to 1–4 metres or 3.3–13.1 feet tall, occasionally up to 10 metres. Its leaves are arranged alternately and are simple, obovate to oblanceolate in shape, 3 to 9 cm long, with serrated margins. They are lustrous and leathery in texture and dark green in color while new growth is a conspicuous bronze or red eventually turning green.

It blooms from early to late spring with drooping trusses of fragrant, white or pink urn-shaped flowers about 10 cm long hanging from the tips of the branches. Each flower is about 5 to 6 mm long and its clusters with their long blooming season provide a decorative effect against the young red leaves. The flowers usually last two or three weeks.

The plant is poisonous if consumed. The toxicity is a result of the grayanotoxins contained by the flowers and leaves. If flowers and leaves are ingested by humans, symptoms may include salivation, headaches, vomiting, cardiac failure, and death. Cattle, goats, horses, dogs, and cats may suffer similar symptoms after ingesting the leaves or flowers of this plant.

The name "andromeda" originated from an earlier genus name for the plant.

== Cultivation ==
Pieris japonica is a popular temperate garden plant, producing colour in early spring. A calcifuge, it requires acid pH soil, typically in a partially shaded setting such as dappled woodland. It associates well with camellias, rhododendrons, and other lime-hating plants.

=== Cultivars ===
The following cultivars have received the Royal Horticultural Society's Award of Garden Merit:

- 'Blush' pink/red flowers, 2.5 m (8.2 ft)
- 'Bonfire' - pink/white flowers, 1 m (3.3 ft)
- 'Carnaval' red/pink leaves turning green edged white, white flowers, 1.5 m (4.9 ft)
- 'Cavatine' - white flowers, 0.5 m (1.6 ft)
- 'Debutante' - cream flowers, 1 m (3.3 ft)
- 'Firecrest' - foliage red to green, flowers pink 2.5 m (8.2 ft)
- 'Flaming Silver' - young red foliage turning green margined silver, 1.5 m (4.9 ft)
- 'Mountain Fire' - red leaves turning green, white flowers 4 m (13 ft)
- 'Pink Delight' - foliage bronze to green, flowers pink to white, 1.5 m (4.9 ft)
- 'Prelude' - cream/white flowers, 1 m (3.3 ft)
- 'Purity' - white flowers, 1.5 m (4.9 ft)
- 'Sarabande' - white flowers, 2.5 m (8.2 ft)
- 'Valley Valentine' - red flowers, 2.5 m (8.2 ft)
