= George Forrest (botanist) =

Scottish botanist (1873–1932)

George Forrest

George Forrest (13 March 1873 – 5 January 1932) was a Scottish botanist, who became one of the first western explorers of China's then remote southwestern province of Yunnan, generally regarded as the most biodiverse province in the country.

== Early life ==
George Forrest was born in Falkirk, Scotland on 13 March 1873. He went to Kilmarnock Academy. After leaving school, he was apprenticed with a local chemist until 1891 when, on the inheritance of a small legacy, he then decided to travel to Australia, where he searched for gold and also worked on a sheep station before returning to Scotland in 1902. Forrest's life then took a most unexpected turn; caught in a shower while fishing the Gladhouse Loch in Tweedsdale, he sought shelter beneath an overhanging bank where he chanced upon an ancient stone coffin.

The discovery led to his introduction to Professor Bayley Balfour, Regius Keeper of the Royal Botanic Garden, Edinburgh, who offered him a job in the Herbarium. Whilst Forrest doubtless found the indoor work dull, it was to provide an excellent preparation for his explorations. A year later, Balfour recommended Forrest, now aged 30, to Liverpool horticulturist and cotton broker Arthur Kilpin Bulley, who was sponsoring an expedition to southwestern China in search of exotic plants, particularly species of rhododendron, of which Yunnan has many.

== Plant collecting ==
George Forrest made his first expedition to Yunnan in 1904. In August, he arrived at the town of Talifu (Dali City). He started setting up a base of operations and began to learn the local language. He then later helped with the inoculation of thousands of locals against smallpox. By the summer of 1905, he was ready to mount his first expedition to the northwest corner of Yunnan near the border with Tibet. He and his team of 17 local collectors stayed briefly at the French mission under Père Étienne-Jules Dubernard in the small town of Tzekou. Forrest and his team then collected numerous plants, herbarium specimens and seeds. In the sanctuary of the rhododendron forests, so rich in variety of flora and fauna, the group was unaware of the massacre that was to meet them on their return to the mission, and that only one would survive.

As one source puts it "This first trip was both exciting and horrifying." Foreigners had been targeted for death by the local Tibetan Buddhist lamas, during the 1905 Tibetan Rebellion. Forrest had a narrow escape, but this did not discourage him from returning to Yunnan. The Lamas pursued him until a Naxi "King" named Lee rescued him. He witnessed atrocities committed by the Lamas during the rebellion. He eventually became perhaps the foremost collector of Yunnan flora, amassing hundreds of species of rhododendron, and other shrubs and perennials.

He was honoured with the Royal Horticultural Society's Victoria Medal of Honour in 1921, and the Veitch Memorial Medal in 1927, and was elected a Fellow of the Linnean Society in 1924.

Altogether, Forrest made seven trips to Yunnan, collecting samples and seeds for the Herbarium and for avid collectors willing to pay for new species to add to their collections. In total, he brought back perhaps 31,000 plant specimens. He discovered numerous species including Gentiana sino-ornata. The specific epithet forrestii now adorns more than thirty genera. Including; Rhododendron forrestii, Pieris formosa var. forrestii, Primula forrestii, Iris forrestii and Hypericum forrestii. He is also remembered in the names of three mammals: Ochotona forresti, Sciurotamias forresti, and Neodon forresti.

Botanical specimens collected by Forrest are held at herbaria around the world, most notably at the herbarium at the Royal Botanic Garden Edinburgh. Collections are also held at the Hong Kong Herbarium, National Herbarium of Victoria at the Royal Botanic Gardens Victoria, Harvard University Herbaria, the herbarium at the Royal Botanic Gardens, Kew, and the Swedish Museum of Natural History.

== Personal life ==
Forrest married Clementina Traill in 1907; they had three sons.

== Death ==
On 5 January 1932, while hunting game in the hills near Tengchong, the town wherein Forrest traditionally set up his base, he suffered a massive heart attack and died instantly. He was buried at Tengchong, next to his friend George Litton, who had been Acting British Consul there until his death 26 years earlier.

== See also ==
- Branklyn Garden
