= List of Award of Garden Merit rhododendrons =

The following is a list of rhododendron cultivars and species which have gained the Royal Horticultural Society's Award of Garden Merit. They are mostly hardy evergreen shrubs with abundant, brilliantly-coloured, trumpet-shaped flowers, often in large spherical trusses. The group known as azaleas are often (but not always) more compact with smaller flowers and leaves, and may be evergreen (subgenus Tsutsuji) or deciduous (subgenus Pentanthera). Most rhododendrons bloom for a short period in late spring (April to May in the temperate Northern Hemisphere). They are seen at their best in a woodland setting with light dappled shade, in humus-rich acid soil.

Maximum dimensions are shown in metres.

name	species	type	colour	Height	Spread
	R. arborescens		white/pink	4.0	4.0
	R. bureavii		pink/white	2.5	2.5
	R. calophytum		pink (pale)	8.0	8.0
	R. davidsonianum		pink (pale)	4.0	2.5
	R. decorum		white	8.0	2.5
	R. falconeri		white	12.0	4.0
	R. fulvum		pink	4.0	4.0
	R. luteum	deciduous azalea	yellow	4.0	4.0
	R. macabeanum		yellow	12.0	12.0
	R. makinoi		pink	2.5	2.5
	R. orbiculare		pink (rose)	2.5	2.5
	R. pachysanthum		pink (pale)	1.5	2.5
	R. pseudochrysanthum		pink (pale)	2.5	2.5
	R. racemosum		white/pink	2.5	2.5
	R. rex		white (cream)	12.0	8.0
	R. rex subsp. fictolacteum		white (cream)	12.0	8.0
	R. rex subsp. rex		white or pink	12.0	8.0
	R. sinogrande		yellow	12.0	8.0
	R. viscosum		white/pink	2.5	2.5
	R. williamsianum		pink (rose)	1.5	1.5
'Albert Schweitzer'			pink (pale)	4.0	2.5
'Alexander'		evergreen azalea	orange	0.5	0.5
'Alice'			rose pink	2.5	2.5
'Bashful'			pink (pale)	1.5	1.5
'Berryrose'		deciduous azalea	salmon pink	2.5	1.5
'Blaauw's Pink'		evergreen azalea	salmon pink	1.0	1.0
'Blewbury'			white	1.5	1.5
'Blue Danube'		evergreen azalea	blue (violet)	2.5	1.5
'Blue Peter'			blue (violet)	2.5	2.5
'Bouquet de Flore'		deciduous azalea	pink/yellow	2.5	1.5
'Canzonetta'		evergreen azalea	rose pink	1.0	1.0
'Cecile'		deciduous azalea	salmon pink/yellow	2.5	2.5
'Chinese Silver'	R. argyrophyllum subsp. nankingense		pink	4.0	2.5
'Cilpinense'			pink (pale)	1.1	1.1
'Cornell Pink'	R. mucronulatum	deciduous	pink (pale)	2.5	1.5
'Crane'			white	1.0	1.0
'Crest'			yellow (pale)	4.0	4.0
'Curlew'			yellow (pale)	0.5	0.5
'Cynthia'			rose-pink	8.0	8.0
'Daviesii'		deciduous azalea	white/yellow	1.5	1.5
'Dopey'			red (crimson)	2.5	2.5
'Dora Amateis'			white	1.0	1.0
'Dreamland'			pink (pale)	1.5	1.0
'Egret'			white	0.5	1.0
'Elisabeth Hobbie'			red (crimson)	0.8	0.8
'Elsie Lee'			purple	1.0	1.0
'Fabia'			orange/pink	2.5	2.5
'Faggeter's Favourite'			white/pink	2.5	2.5
'Fantastica'			red/white	1.0	1.0
'Fastuosum Flore Pleno'			blue	4.0	4.0
'Fireball'		deciduous azalea	red (scarlet)	2.5	2.5
'Furnivall's Daughter'			pink/maroon	4.0	4.0
'Gartendirektor Rieger'			pink (pale)	1.5	1.5
'Gibraltar'		deciduous azalea	yellow/red	1.5	1.5
'Ginny Gee'			pink (pale)	0.5	1.0
'Golden Torch'			yellow (pale)	1.5	1.5
'Goldkrone'			yellow	1.5	1.5
'Gomer Waterer'			pink/yellow	2.5	2.5
'Gristede'			blue	1.0	1.0
'Hachmann's Marlis'			pink (rose)	1.5	1.5
'Hachmann's Polaris'			pink (purple)	1.5	1.5
'Hachmann's Porzellan'			white/yellow/green	1.5	1.5
'Hino-crimson'		evergreen azalea	crimson	0.5	0.5
'Hinomayo'			pink (pale)	1.0	1.0
'Homebush'		deciduous azalea	pink	1.5	1.5
'Hotspur Red'		deciduous azalea	red (scarlet)	1.5	1.5
'Hydon Dawn'			pink (pale)	1.5	1.5
'Hydon Hunter'			pink (rose)	1.5	1.5
'Johanna'		evergreen azalea	red (carmine)	1.0	1.0
'Kate Waterer'			pink (rose)	2.5	2.5
'Klondyke'		deciduous azalea	orange/yellow	2.5	2.5
'Kluis Sensation'			red (scarlet)	2.5	2.5
'Koichiro Wada'	R. yakushimanum		pink/white	1.5	1.5
'Lady Clementine Mitford'			pink (peach)	2.5	2.5
'Lavender Girl'			pink (mauve)	2.5	2.5
'Lem's Cameo'			pink/red	2.5	2.5
'Lem's Monarch'			pink/white	2.5	2.5
'Loderi King George'			pink (pale)	4.0	4.0
'Loderi Pink Diamond'			pink (pale)	4.0	4.0
'Loder's White'			white	2.5	2.5
'Lord Roberts'			red (crimson)	2.5	2.5
'Markeeta's Prize'			red (scarlet)	2.5	2.5
'Merganser'			yellow (primrose)	1.0	1.0
'Mid-winter'	R. dauricum		purple	1.5	1.5
'Moerheim'			blue (violet)	1.0	1.0
'Mother's Day'		evergreen azalea	red (crimson)	0.7	0.7
'Mrs A.T. de la Mare'			white	2.5	2.5
'Mrs Charles E. Pearson'			pink (pale)	4.0	2.5
'Mrs Furnivall'			pink (rose)	2.5	2.5
'Mrs T.H. Lowinsky'			white/orange	2.5	2.5
'Myrtilloides Group'	R. campylogynum		lavender pink	0.5	0.5
'Nancy Evans'			yellow	1.5	1.5
'Nancy Waterer'			yellow	2.5	2.5
'Narcissiflorum'		deciduous azalea	yellow	2.5	2.5
'Niagara'		evergreen azalea	white	0.6	0.6
'Olga'			yellow/pink	1.5	1.5
'Openwood'	R. yunnanense	semi-evergreen	pink (pale)	8.0	4.0
'Palestrina'		evergreen azalea	white	1.5	1.0
'Panda'			yellow/pink	1.5	1.5
'Patty Bee'			yellow (pale)	1.0	1.0
'Penheale Blue'			yellow (pale)	1.0	1.0
'Percy Wiseman'			white (cream)	2.5	2.5
'Persil'		deciduous azalea	white/yellow	2.5	1.5
'Pink Cherub'			pink	1.5	1.5
'Pink Pancake'			pink (salmon)	0.5	1.5
'Praecox'			pink (rose)	1.5	1.5
'Princess Anne'			yellow (pale)	1.0	1.0
'Ptarmigan'			white	0.9	0.9
'Ramapo'			purple (violet)	1.0	1.0
'Razorbill'			pink (rose)	1.5	1.5
'Renoir'			pink (rose)	1.5	1.5
'Rock Rose'	R. racemosum		pink	1.5	1.5
'Rosata'		deciduous azalea	pink (rose)	4.0	2.5
'Saint Merryn'			blue (violet)	4.0	2.5
'Satan'			red (scarlet)	2.5	2.5
'Scarlet Wonder'			red (scarlet)	1.5	1.5
'Silver Slipper'			white/yellow	2.5	2.5
'Squirrel'		evergreen azalea	orange	1.0	1.0
'Strawberry Ice'		deciduous azalea	pink/orange	2.5	2.5
'The Honourable Jean Marie de Montague'			red (crimson)	2.5	2.5
'Tidbit'			yellow (cream)	1.0	1.5
'Tortoiseshell Wonder'			salmon pink	2.5	2.5
'Vintage Rosé'			pink (rose)	1.0	1.0
'Vulcan'			red (scarlet)	1.5	1.5
'Vuyk's Rosyred'			pink (rose)	1.0	1.5
'Vuyk's Scarlet'			red (scarlet)	1.0	1.5
'Wee Bee'			pink/red	0.5	1.0
'White Lights'			white	1.5	1.5
'Yaku Fairy'	R. keiskei var. ozawae		yellow (lemon)	0.5	1.0

== See also ==
- List of Rhododendron species
- Rhododendron
