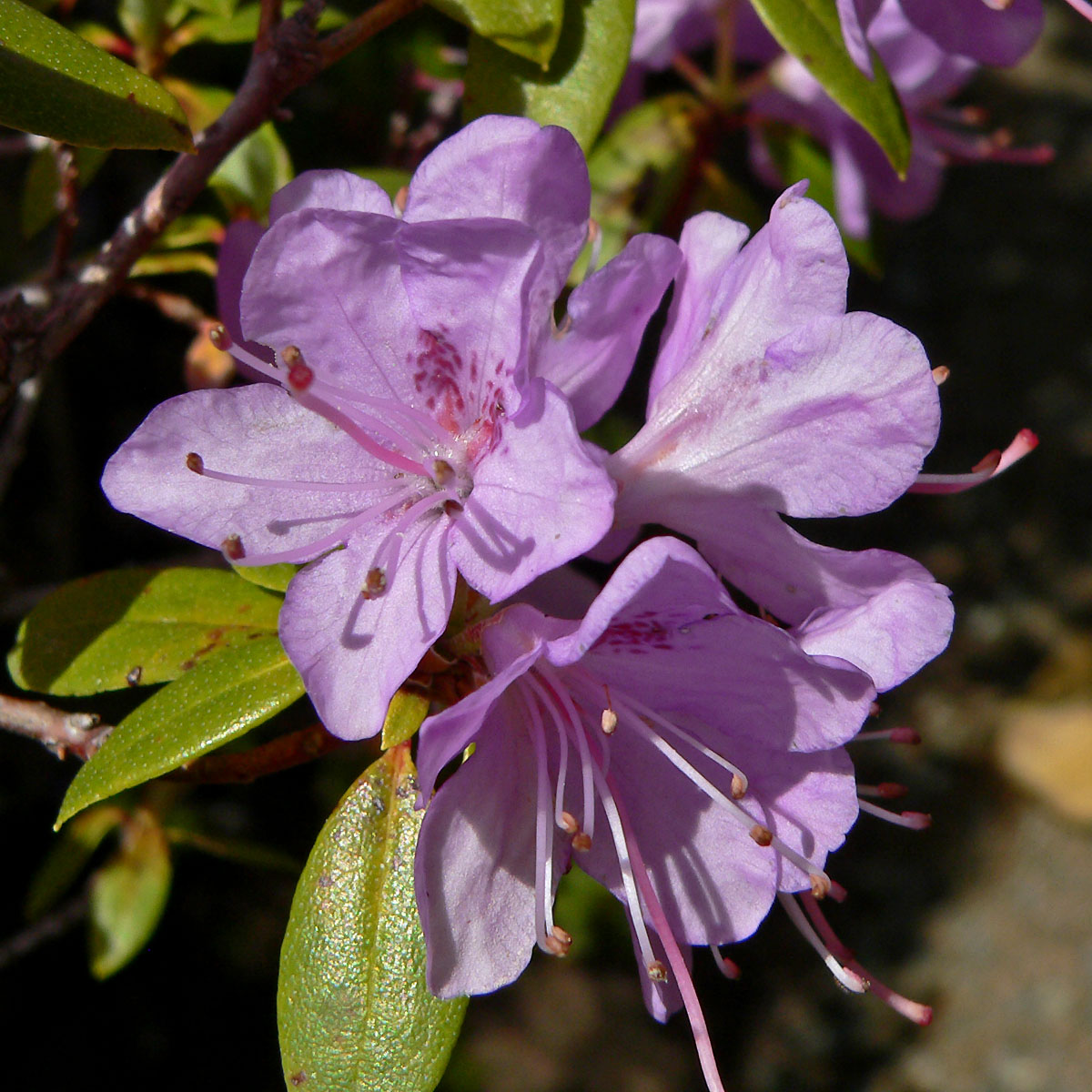
- Close-up of flowers
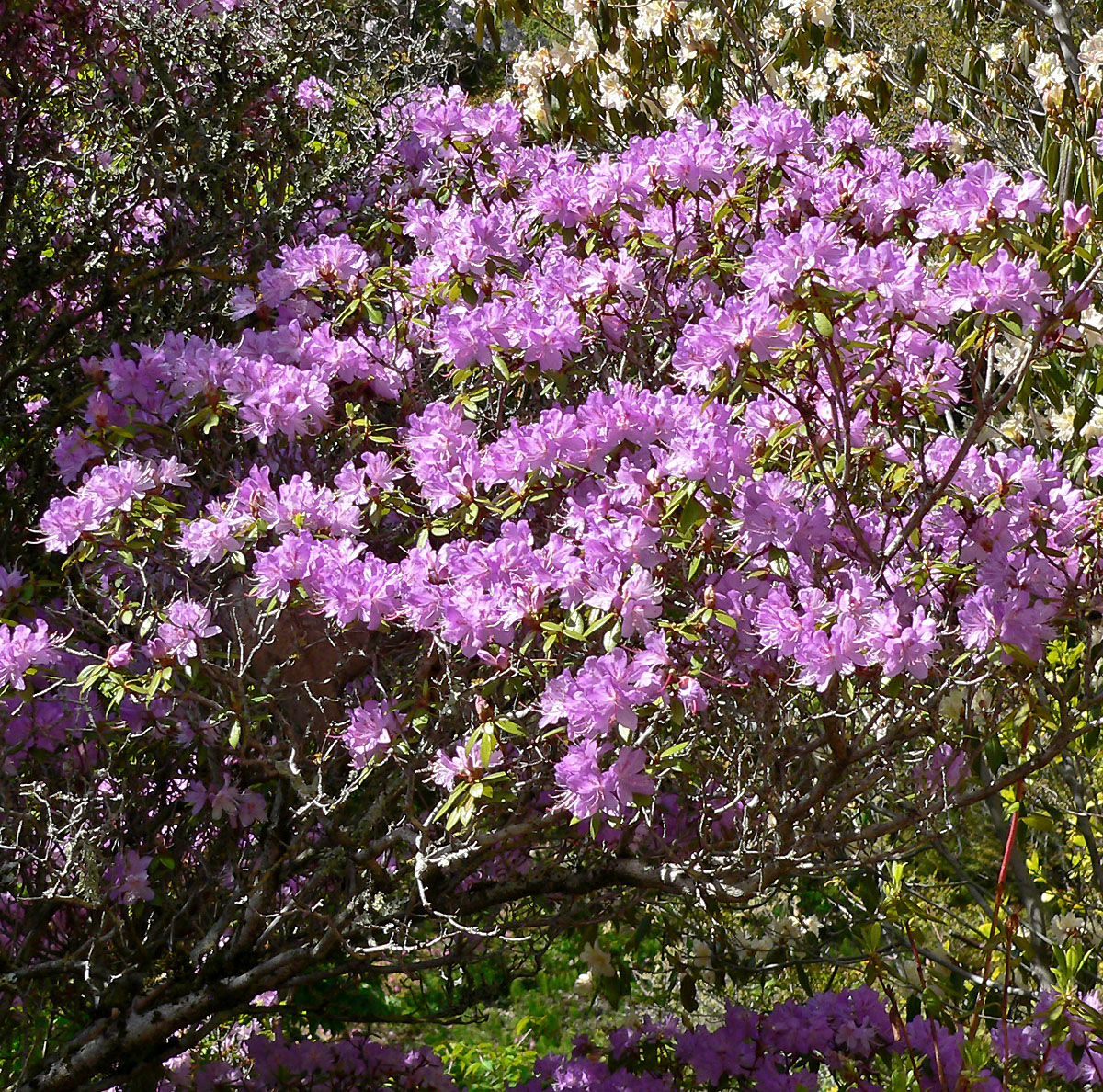
- At the University of California Botanical Garden

Scientific classification
- Kingdom: Plantae
- Clade: Embryophytes
- Clade: Tracheophytes
- Clade: Spermatophytes
- Clade: Angiosperms
- Clade: Eudicots
- Clade: Asterids
- Order: Ericales
- Family: Ericaceae
- Genus: Rhododendron
- Species: R. tatsienense

Binomial name
- Rhododendron tatsienense Franch.

Synonyms
- Rhododendron heishuiense W.P.Fang; Rhododendron hypophaeum Balf.f. & Forrest; Rhododendron kangdingense Z.J.Zhao; Rhododendron leilungense Balf.f. & Forrest; Rhododendron stereophyllum Balf.f. & W.W.Sm.; Rhododendron tapelouense H.Lév.

= Rhododendron tatsienense =

Species of flowering plant

Rhododendron tatsienense (syn. Rhododendron hypophaeum) is a species of flowering plant in the family Ericaceae, native to south-central China. It resembles Rhododendron davidsonianum and R. siderophyllum.

== Subtaxa ==
The following varieties are accepted:

- Rhododendron tatsienense var. nudatum R.C.Fang – northwestern Yunnan
- Rhododendron tatsienense var. tatsienense – Sichuan, northern Yunnan, Guizhou
