= R. rex =

R. rex may refer to:

- Rhinolophus rex, the king horseshoe bat, a bat species endemic to China
- Rhododendron rex, a plant species found in China, India and Myanmar
- Ripiphorus rex, a species of wedge-shaped beetle

== See also ==
- Rex (disambiguation)
