= Razorbill (disambiguation) =

Razorbill is a large bird.

Razorbill may also refer to:

- Razorbill (publisher), a publishing imprint of Penguin Group
- Empire Razorbill, an Empire ship
- HMS Razorbill, a ship of the Coastal Forces of the Royal Navy
- USCGC Razorbill (WPB-87332), a Marine Protector-class patrol boat
- Razorbill, a 2006 play by Laura Ruohonen
- Razorbill, an Award of Garden Merit rhododendron
