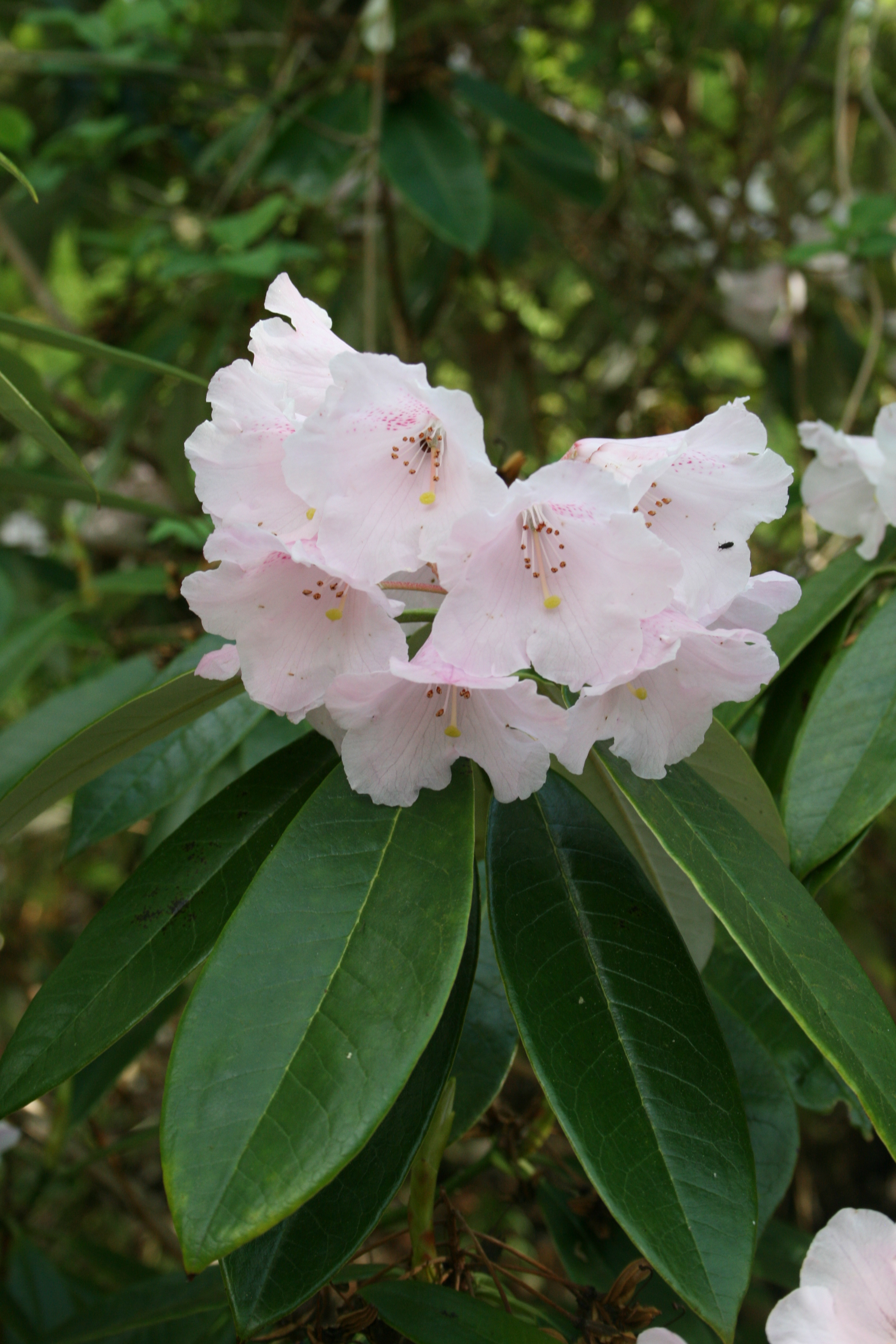

Scientific classification
- Kingdom: Plantae
- Clade: Tracheophytes
- Clade: Angiosperms
- Clade: Eudicots
- Clade: Asterids
- Order: Ericales
- Family: Ericaceae
- Genus: Rhododendron
- Species: R. argyrophyllum

Binomial name
- Rhododendron argyrophyllum Franch.

Synonyms
- Rhododendron chionophyllum Diels

= Rhododendron argyrophyllum =

Species of plant

Rhododendron argyrophyllum (银叶杜鹃) is a species of flowering plant in the heath family Ericaceae. It is native to forested slopes at 1,600–2,300 m (5,200–7,500 ft) in E and NW Guizhou, S and W Sichuan, and NE Yunnan in China.

== Description ==
Growing 3–7 m (9.8–23.0 ft) tall, it is an evergreen shrub with handsome elliptic or lanceolate leaves up to 13 cm (5.1 in) in length; and pale pink bell-shaped flowers in late spring. The Latin specific epithet argyrophyllum, meaning "silver-leaved", refers to the silvery-white under-surface (indumentum) of the leaves.

== Lower taxa ==
Several lower taxa are accepted:

- Rhododendron argyrophyllum subsp. argyrophyllum
- Rhododendron argyrophyllum subsp. nankingense (Cowan) D. F. Chamb.
- Rhododendron argyrophyllum subsp. omeiense (Rehder & E. H. Wilson) D. F. Chamb.
- Rhododendron argyrophyllum var. glabriovarium M.Y.He

== Cultivation ==
R. argyrophyllum is hardy down to −15 °C (5 °F) but like most rhododendron species requires a sheltered position in dappled shade with acid soil that has been enriched with leaf mould.

The cultivar R. argyrophyllum subsp. nankingense 'Chinese Silver' has gained the Royal Horticultural Society's Award of Garden Merit.
