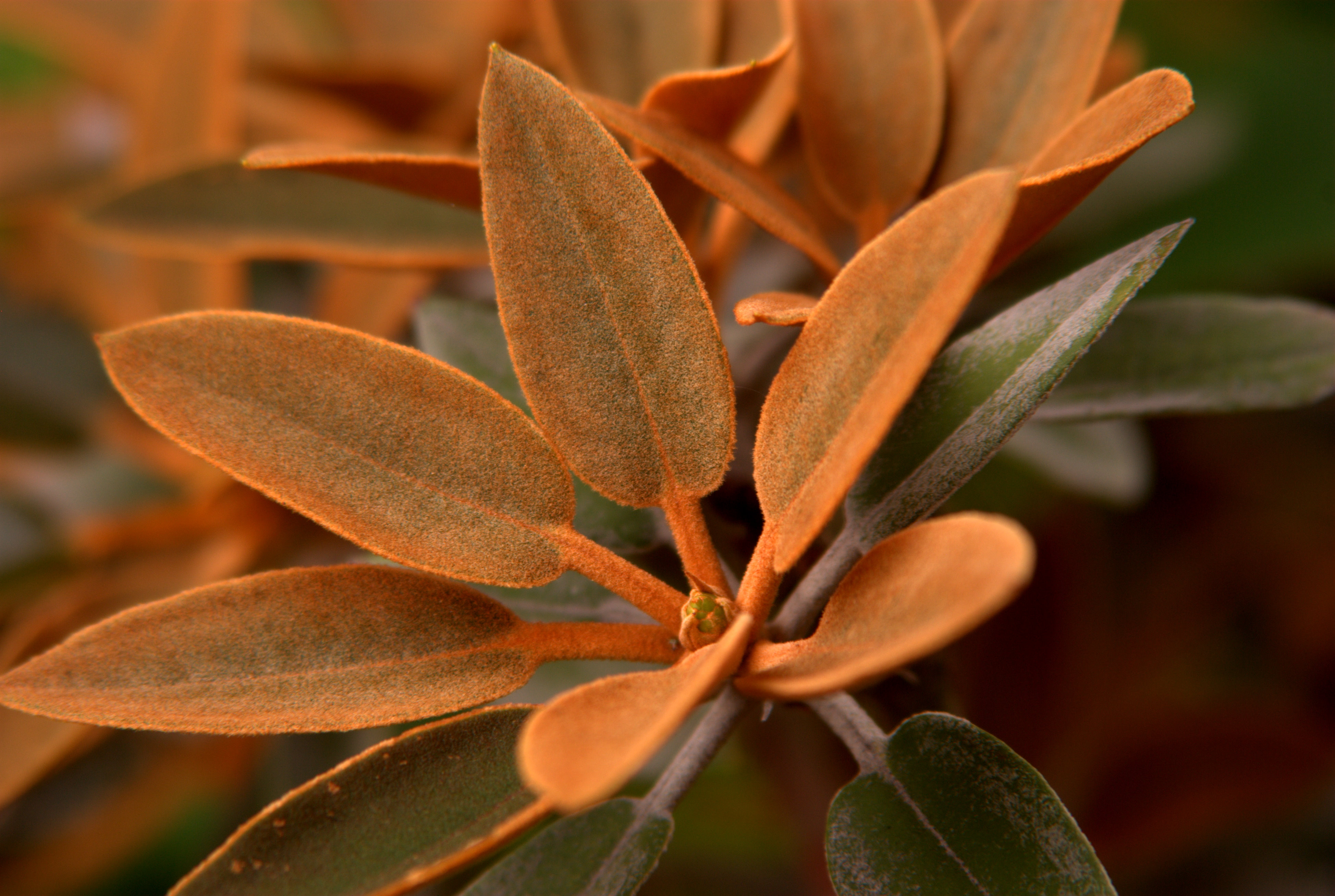

Scientific classification
- Kingdom: Plantae
- Clade: Tracheophytes
- Clade: Angiosperms
- Clade: Eudicots
- Clade: Asterids
- Order: Ericales
- Family: Ericaceae
- Genus: Rhododendron
- Species: R. pachysanthum

Binomial name
- Rhododendron pachysanthum Hayata

= Rhododendron pachysanthum =

Species of flowering plant

Rhododendron pachysanthum (Chinese: 台湾山地杜鹃; pinyin: Táiwān shāndì dùjuān), the thick-flowered rhododendron, is a species of flowering plant in the heath family Ericaceae, that is native to Taiwan. It is an evergreen shrub growing to 2.5 m (8.2 ft) tall and broad. This species is particularly noted for its 9 cm (3.5 in) leaves, which may be heavily felted on both surfaces, red above and brown beneath. In early spring, trusses of pale pink flowers appear, spotted crimson on the inner surface.

In cultivation in the UK Rhododendron pachysanthum has gained the Royal Horticultural Society's Award of Garden Merit. It is hardy down to −15 °C (5 °F) but like most rhododendrons it requires a sheltered spot in dappled shade, and an acid soil enriched with leaf mould.

== Synonyms ==
- Rhododendron pseudochrysanthum Hayata
- Rhododendron f. rufovelutinum T. Yamazaki
- Rhododendron pseudochrysanthum var. rufovelutinum (T. Yamazaki) T. Yamazaki
- Rhododendron rufum Batalin var. pachysanthum (Hayata) S. S. Ying.
