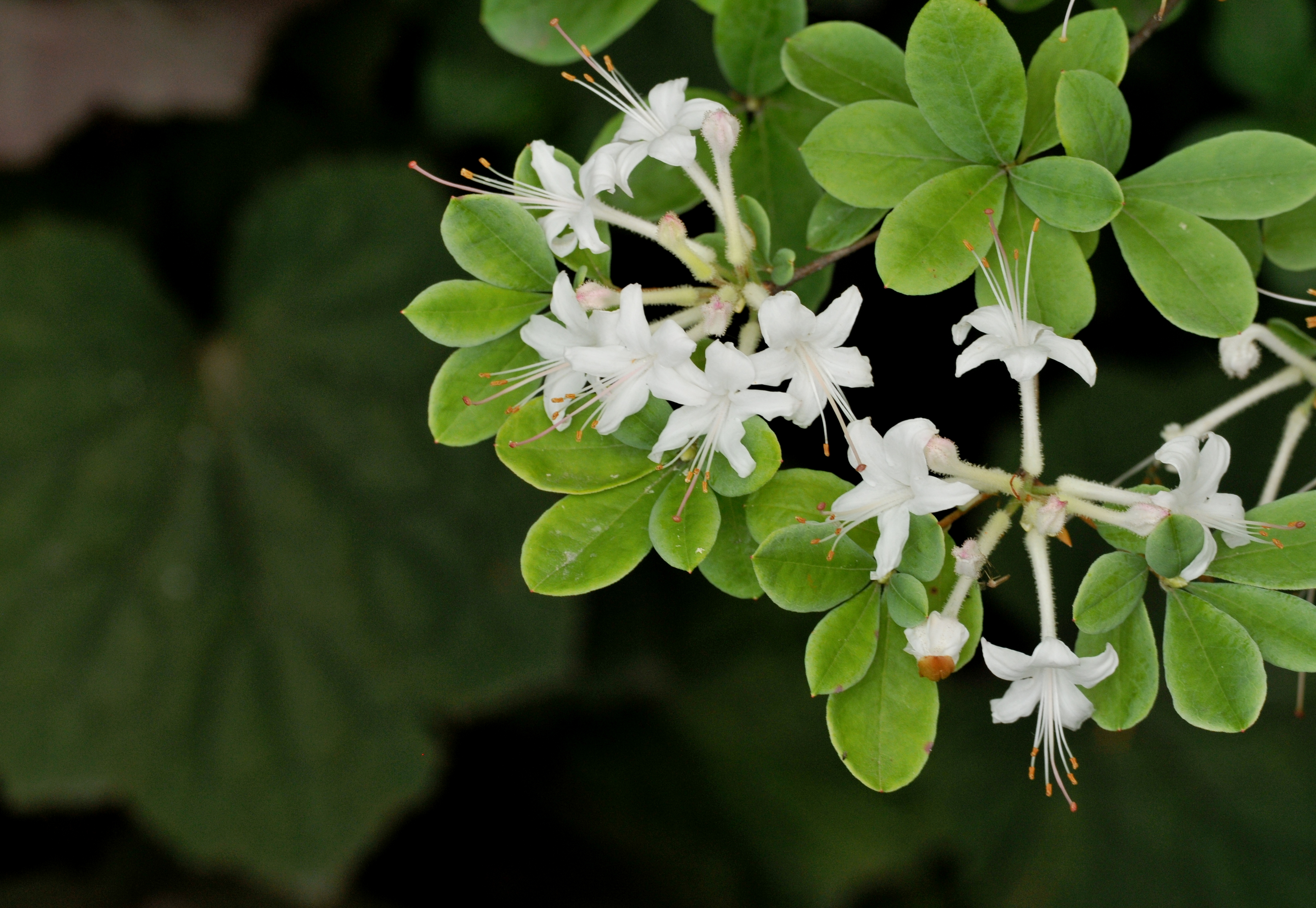

Conservation status
- Least Concern (IUCN 3.1)

Scientific classification
- Kingdom: Plantae
- Clade: Tracheophytes
- Clade: Angiosperms
- Clade: Eudicots
- Clade: Asterids
- Order: Ericales
- Family: Ericaceae
- Genus: Rhododendron
- Species: R. viscosum

Binomial name
- Rhododendron viscosum (L.) Torr.

Synonyms
- Azalea nitida Pursh; Azalea oblongifolia Small; Azalea viscosa L.; Rhododendron oblongifolium (Small) Millais; Rhododendron viscosum var. glaucum Torr.; Rhododendron viscosum var. nitidum (Pursh) A. Gray; Rhododendron viscosum f. rhodanthum Rehder

= Rhododendron viscosum =

Species of flowering plant

Rhododendron viscosum, the swamp azalea, clammy azalea or swamp honeysuckle, is a species of flowering plant in the heath family Ericaceae. A deciduous shrub, it grows to 2.5 m (8.2 ft) tall and broad. It is native to the eastern United States. It has rounded matt green leaves. In early summer it produces funnel-shaped white flowers flushed pink. The flowers have prominent stamens and are strongly fragrant.

It is hardy down to −20 °C (−4 °F) but like most rhododendron species requires a sheltered position in dappled shade with acid soil that has been enriched with leaf mold. In cultivation in the UK, Rhododendron viscosum has gained the Royal Horticultural Society's Award of Garden Merit.

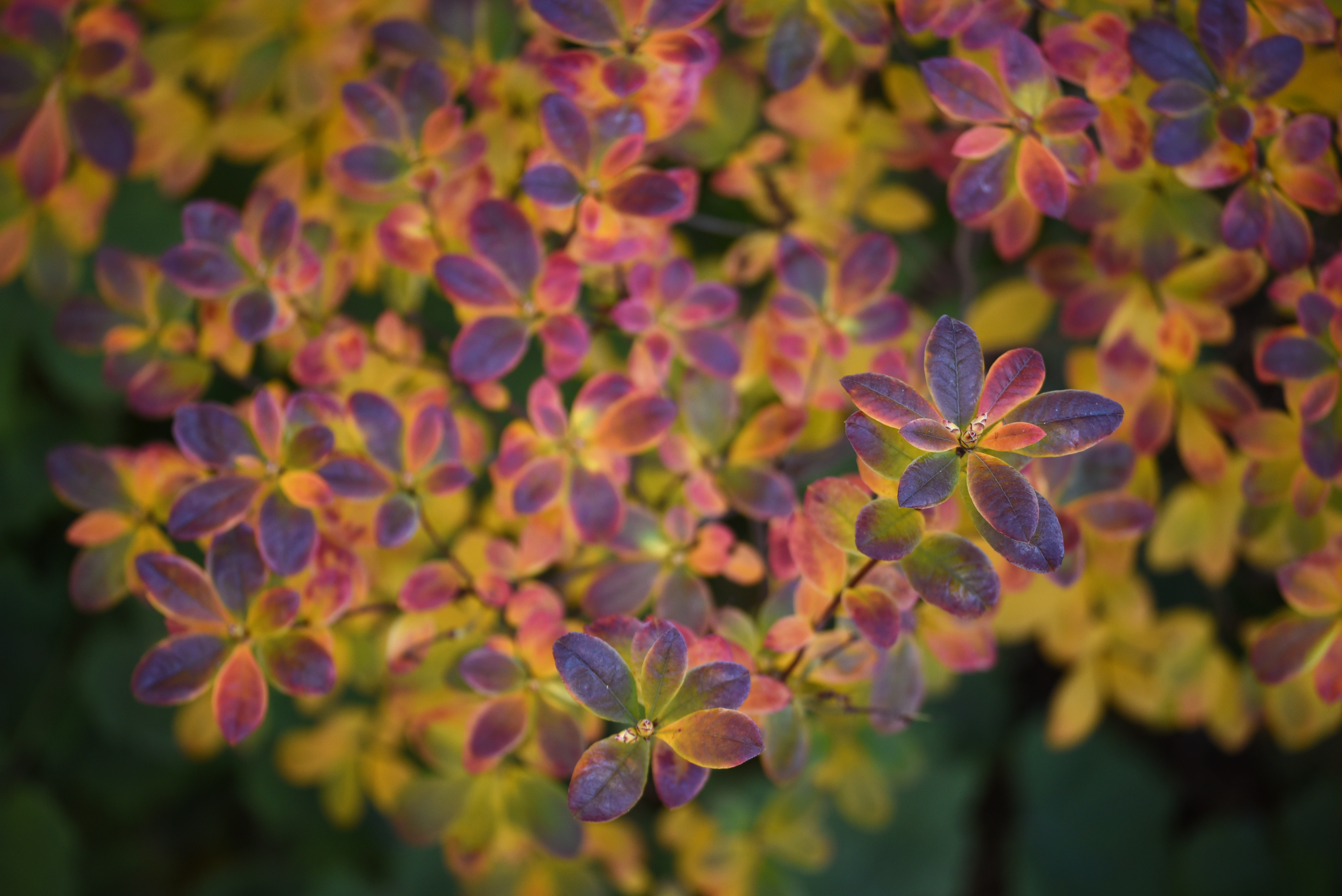
Fall foliage at the High Line, New York
