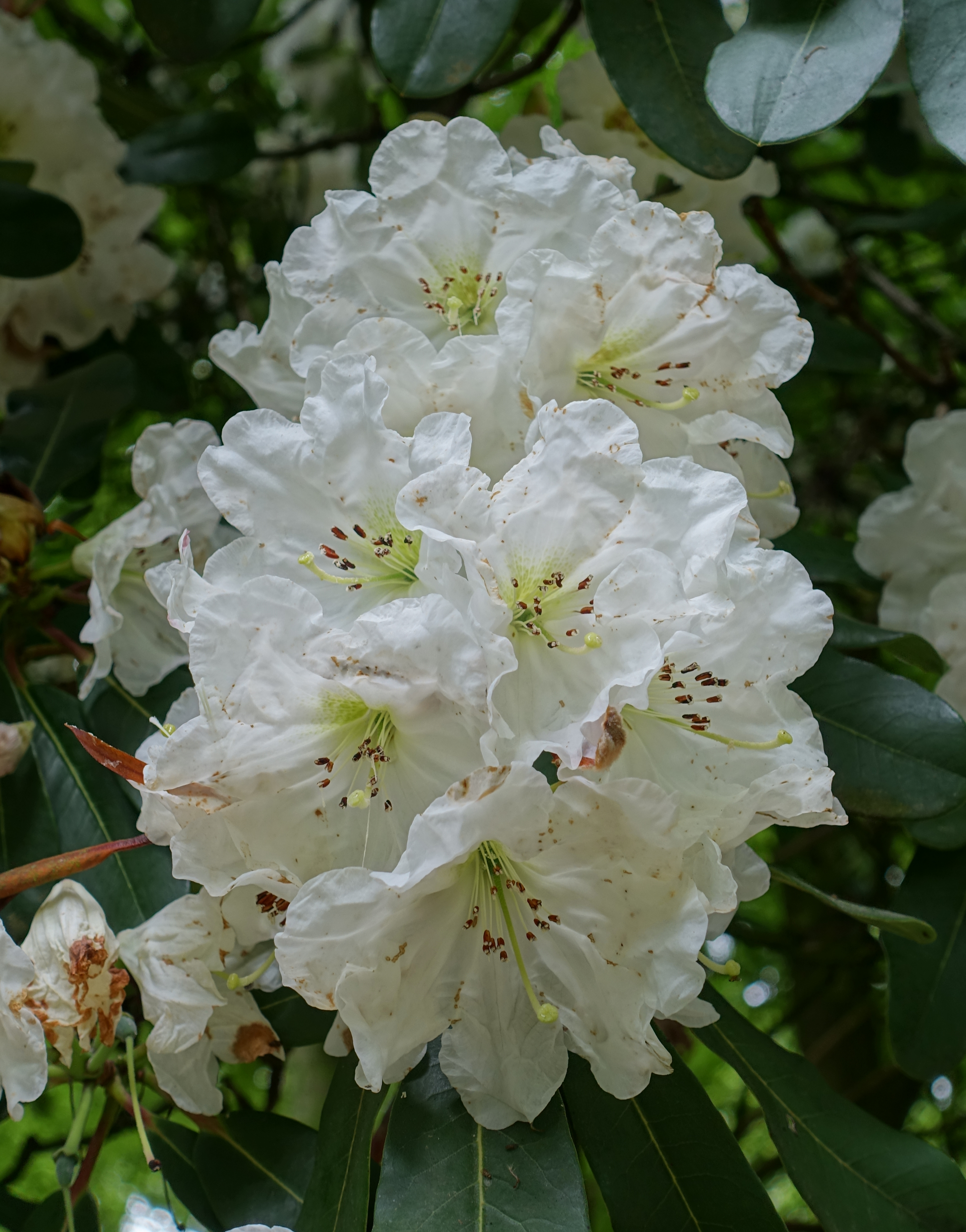

Scientific classification
- Kingdom: Plantae
- Clade: Tracheophytes
- Clade: Angiosperms
- Clade: Eudicots
- Clade: Asterids
- Order: Ericales
- Family: Ericaceae
- Genus: Rhododendron
- Species: R. decorum

Binomial name
- Rhododendron decorum Franch.

= Rhododendron decorum =

Species of flowering plant

Rhododendron decorum, the great white rhododendron (Chinese: 大白杜鹃) is a species of flowering plant in the heath family Ericaceae. It is an evergreen shrub native to high forested regions of northern Myanmar and Guizhou, Sichuan, Xizang, and Yunnan, China growing at altitudes of 1,800–4,000 m (5,900–13,100 ft). Depending on the growing environment (either temperate or sub-alpine forest) it can be found as a shrub or small tree of 1–6 m (3.3–19.7 ft), with leathery leaves that are oblong, oblong-ovate or oblong-elliptic in shape and between 5–19 cm in length and 3–11 cm in width. Flowers are borne in trusses, white to pale pink, with a yellow throat, large and very fragrant.

It was first described by French botanist Adrien René Franchet in 1886.

In cultivation in the UK, Rhododendron decorum has gained the Royal Horticultural Society's Award of Garden Merit. It is hardy down to −20 °C (−4 °F) but requires a sheltered position and an acid soil that is rich in leaf mould.

== Lower taxa ==
- Rhododendron decorum subsp. cordatum W. K. Hu
- Rhododendron decorum subsp. decorum (Batalin) H. Hara
- Rhododendron decorum subsp. diaprepes (I. B. Balfour & W. W. Smith) T. L. Ming
- Rhododendron decorum subsp. parvistigmatis W. K. Hu
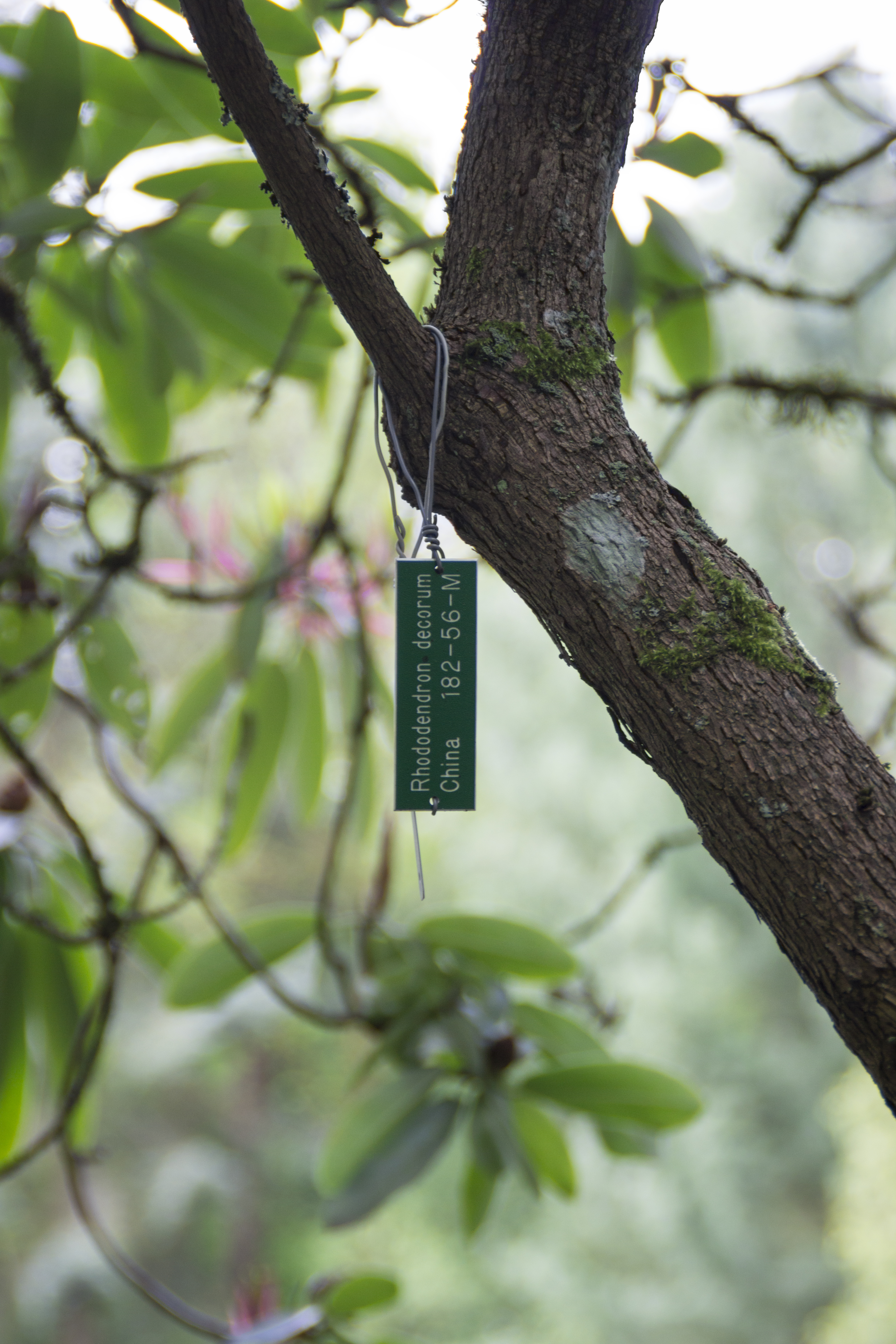
Tree tag of R. decorum tree

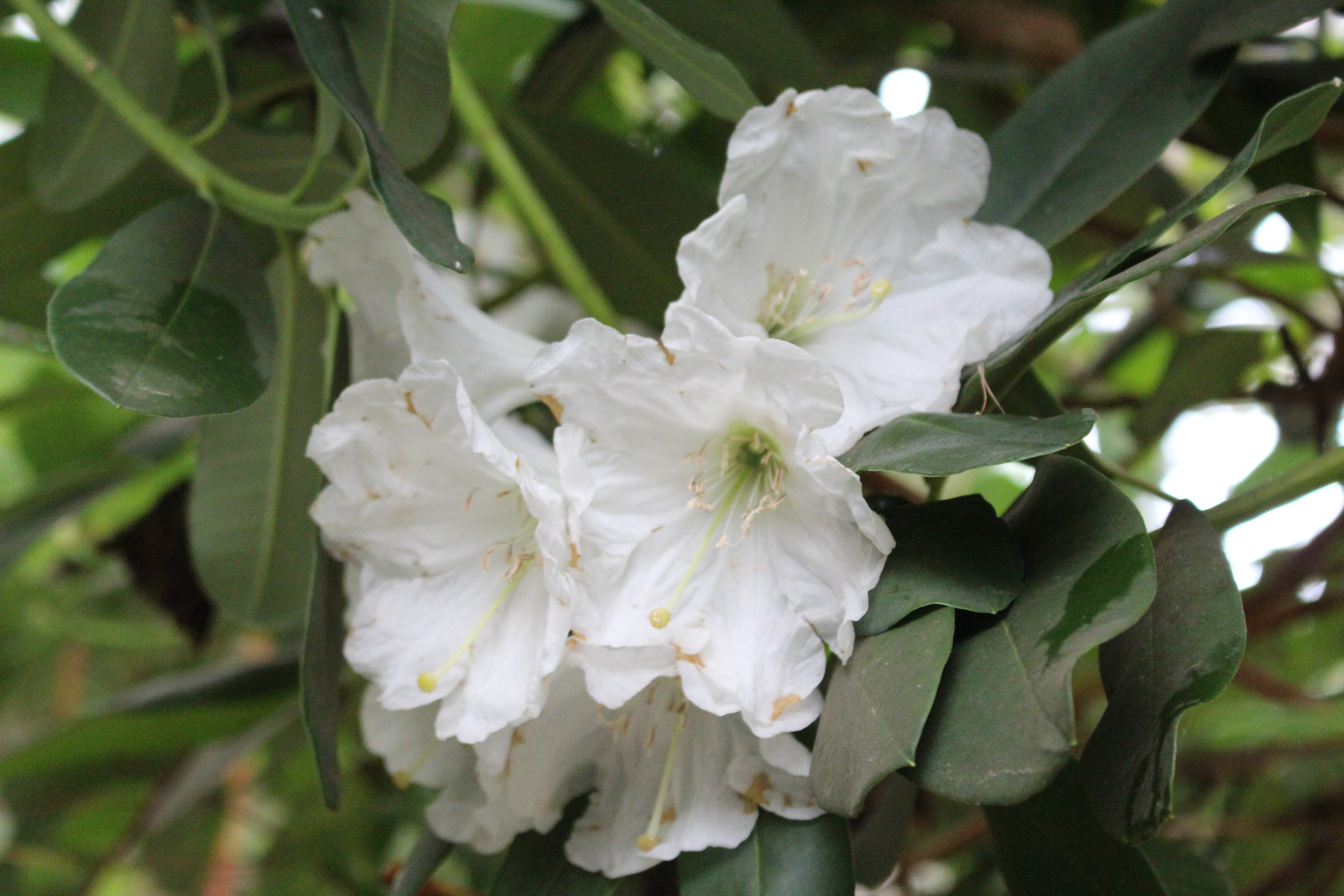
R. decorum subsp. diaprepes
