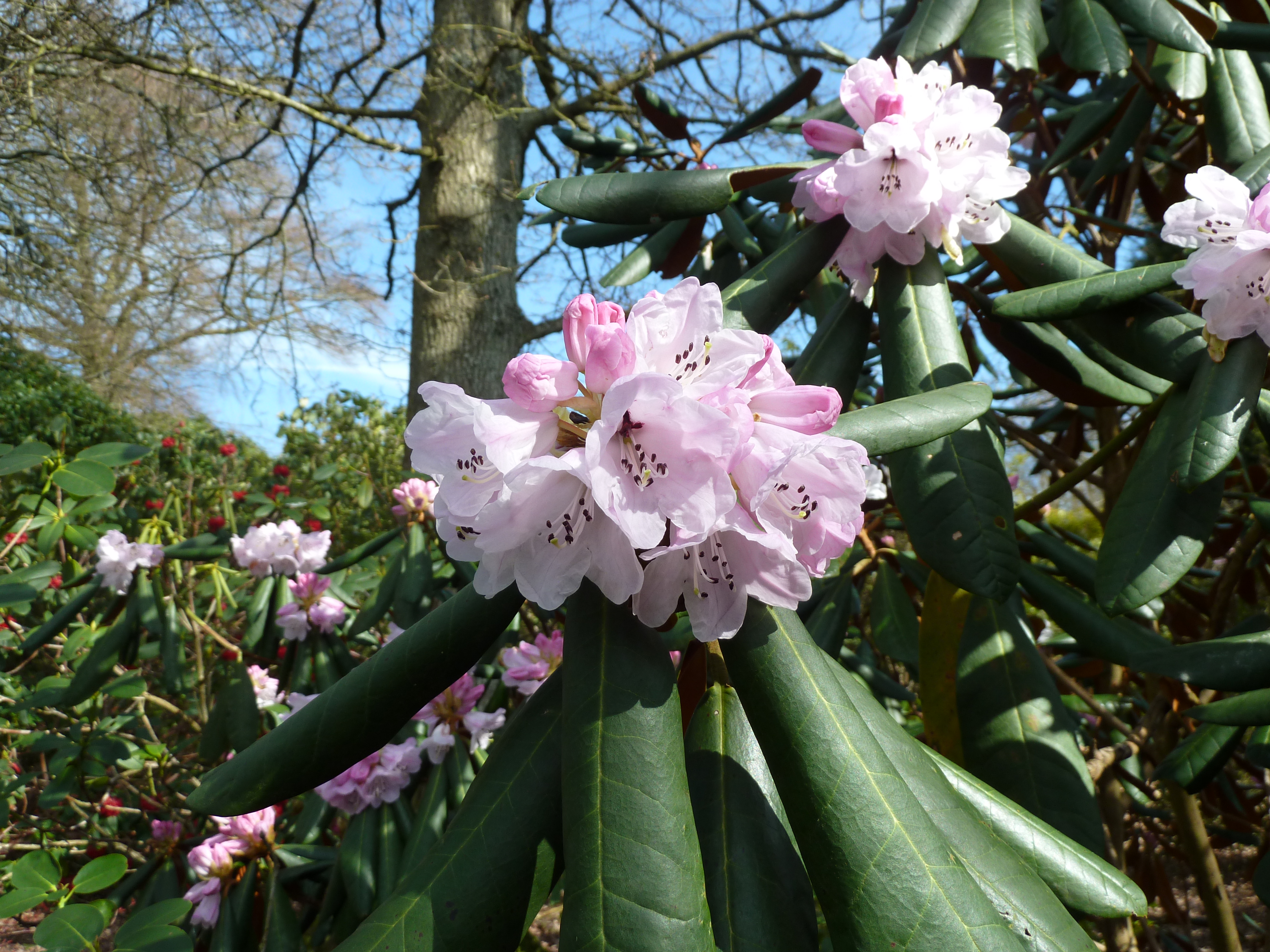

Conservation status
- Least Concern (IUCN 3.1)

Scientific classification
- Kingdom: Plantae
- Clade: Tracheophytes
- Clade: Angiosperms
- Clade: Eudicots
- Clade: Asterids
- Order: Ericales
- Family: Ericaceae
- Genus: Rhododendron
- Species: R. fulvum

Binomial name
- Rhododendron fulvum Balf.f. & W.W.Sm.

= Rhododendron fulvum =

Species of plant

Rhododendron fulvum (Chinese: 镰果杜鹃; pinyin: liánguǒ dùjuān) is a species of flowering plant in the heath family Ericaceae, native to northern Myanmar and China. In China, it is found in southwest Sichuan, southeast Xizang, and western Yunnan. It grows at altitudes of 2,700–4,400 m (8,900–14,400 ft). It is an evergreen shrub or small tree growing to 2–8 m (6.6–26.2 ft) in height, with leathery leaves that are oblanceolate to oblong-lanceolate or obovate, 8–20 by 3–7.5 cm in size. The undersides are felted with a striking cinnamon colour. The flowers, borne in trusses in spring, are loosely bell-shaped, pale rose pink, with a crimson basal blotch and sometimes red spots.

In cultivation in the UK Rhododendron fulvum has gained the Royal Horticultural Society's Award of Garden Merit. It is hardy down to −15 °C (5 °F) but requires a sheltered spot in dappled shade, and an acid soil enriched with leaf mould.

== Lower taxa ==
- Rhododendron fulvum subsp. fulvoides (I. B. Balfour & Forrest) D. F. Chamberlain
- Rhododendron fulvum subsp. fulvum (listed as a synonym by some authorities)
