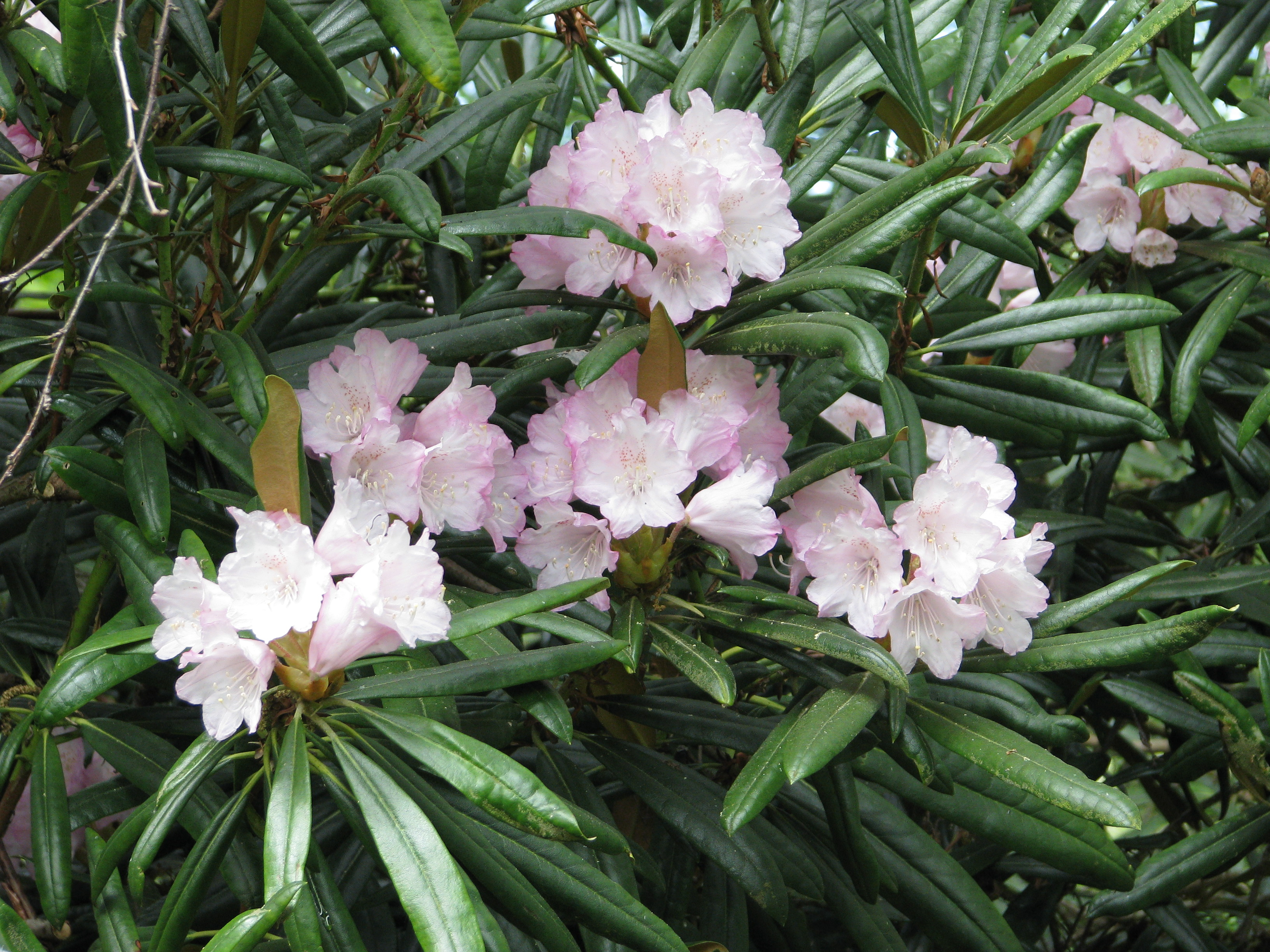

Scientific classification
- Kingdom: Plantae
- Clade: Tracheophytes
- Clade: Angiosperms
- Clade: Eudicots
- Clade: Asterids
- Order: Ericales
- Family: Ericaceae
- Genus: Rhododendron
- Species: R. makinoi

Binomial name
- Rhododendron makinoi Tagg ex Nakai

= Rhododendron makinoi =

Species of flowering plant

Rhododendron makinoi, the Makino rhododendron, is a species of flowering plant in the heath family Ericaceae that is native to Japan. It is a compact evergreen shrub growing to 2.5 m (8.2 ft) tall and broad, with woolly young shoots and long narrow curved leaves, heavily felted brown on the reverse. The flowers, borne in trusses in spring, are bell-shaped, deep pink in bud and opening pale pink, with red spots on the interior.

In cultivation in the UK Rhododendron makinoi has gained the Royal Horticultural Society's Award of Garden Merit. It is hardy down to −15 °C (5 °F) but requires a sheltered spot in dappled shade, and an acid soil enriched with leaf mould.
