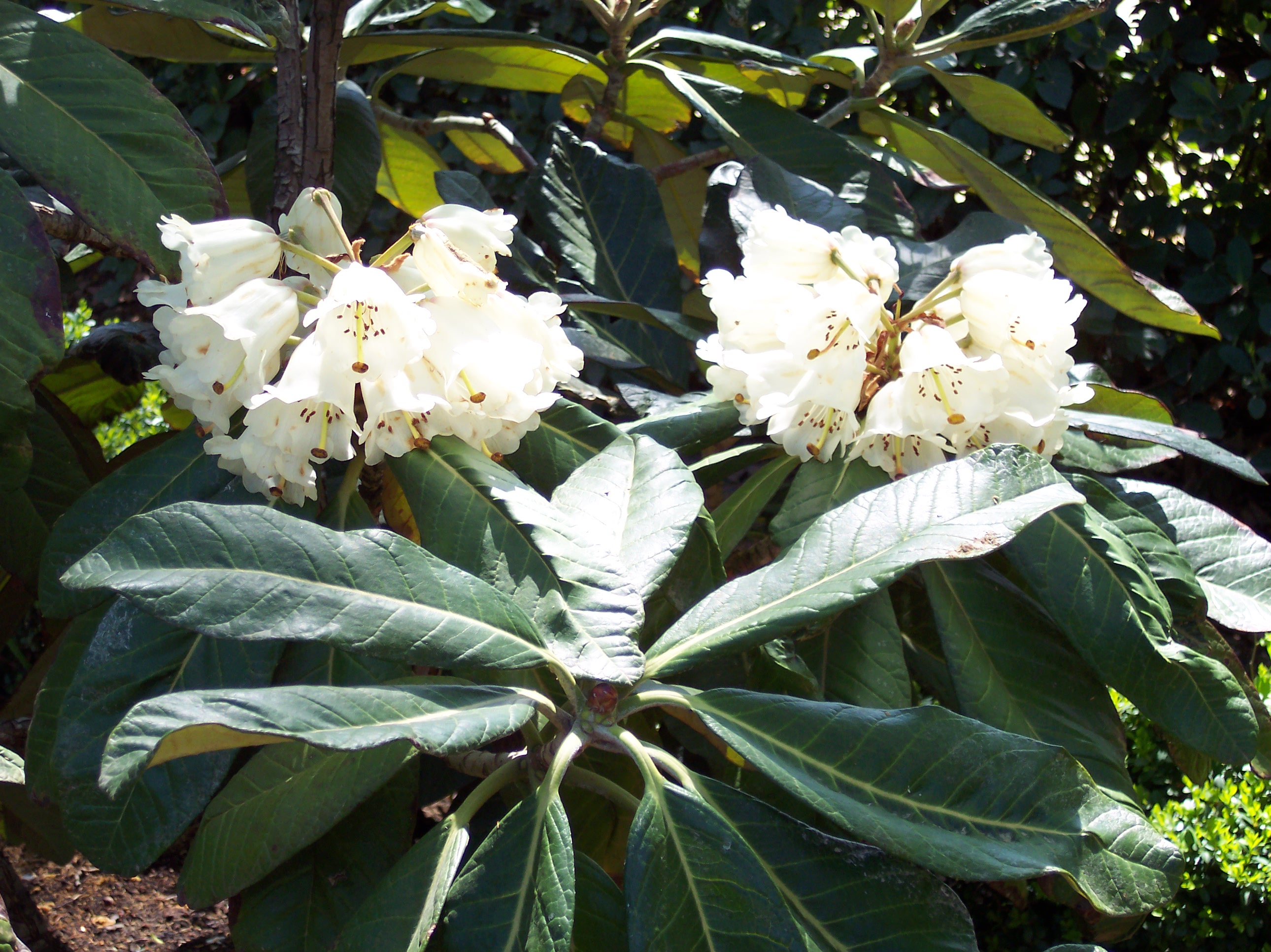

Conservation status
- Least Concern (IUCN 3.1)

Scientific classification
- Kingdom: Plantae
- Clade: Tracheophytes
- Clade: Angiosperms
- Clade: Eudicots
- Clade: Asterids
- Order: Ericales
- Family: Ericaceae
- Genus: Rhododendron
- Species: R. sinogrande

Binomial name
- Rhododendron sinogrande Balf.f. & W.W.Sm.

= Rhododendron sinogrande =

Species of plant

Rhododendron sinogrande (凸尖杜鹃) is a species of flowering plant in the family Ericaceae. It is commonly called the great Chinese rhododendron, and is native to alpine regions at 2,100–3,600 m (6,900–11,800 ft) in southeastern Xizang and western Yunnan in China and in northeastern Myanmar.

== Description ==
The great Chinese rhododendron is a substantial evergreen shrub or small tree reaching a height of 12 m (39 ft) with leaves up to 70 cm (28 in) long, but occasionally up to 90 centimetres (35 in) long by up to 35 centimetres (14 in) broad; they are dark green above, and silvery-grey below with short, dense hairs. In late spring it bears large trusses of pale yellow or cream flowers, each up to 8 cm (3.1 in) long, spotted with maroon on the interior.

== Cultivation ==
In cultivation in the UK Rhododendron sinogrande has gained the Royal Horticultural Society's Award of Garden Merit. It is hardy down to −10 °C (14 °F) but like most rhododendrons it requires a sheltered spot in dappled shade, and an acid soil enriched with leaf mould.
