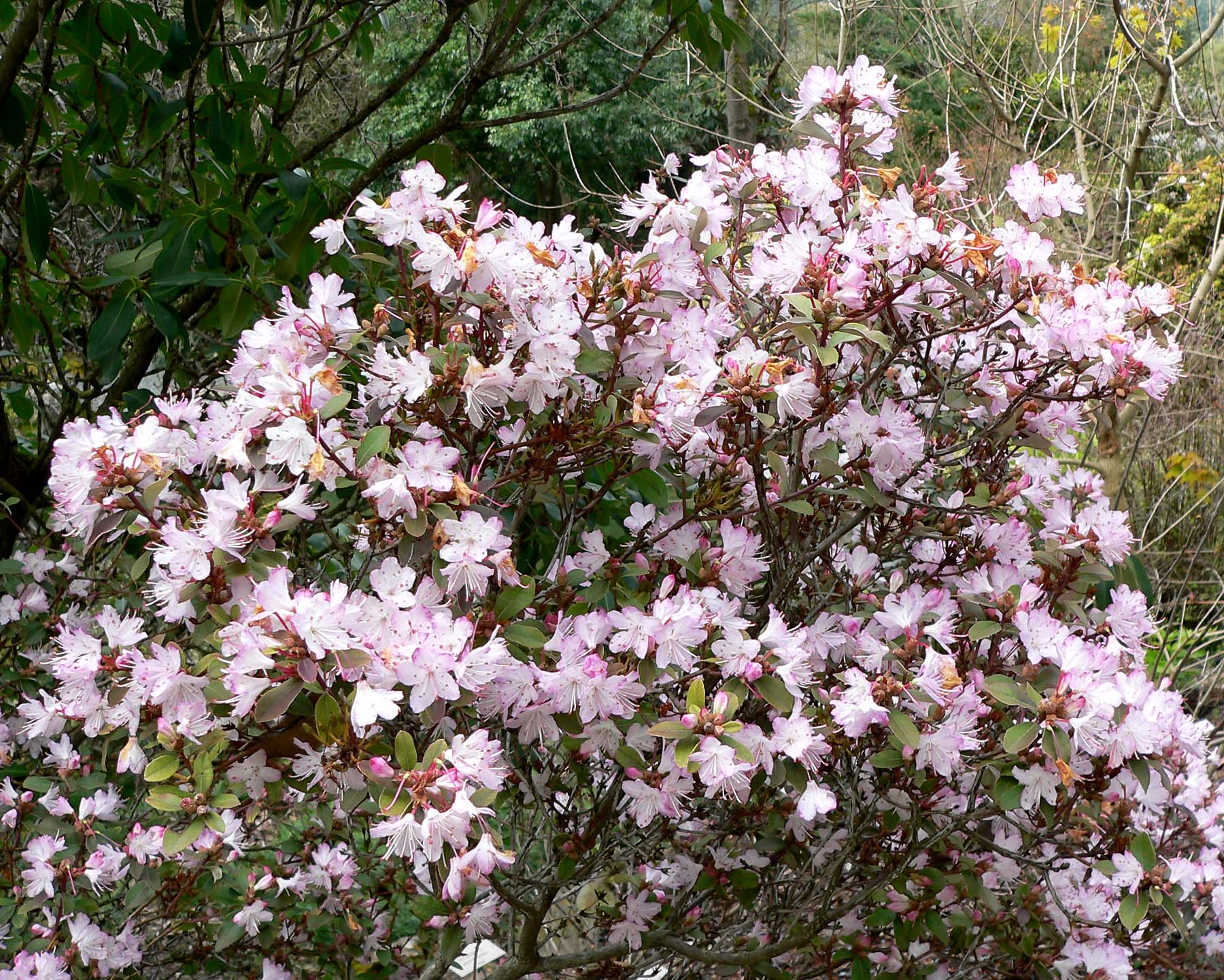

Scientific classification
- Kingdom: Plantae
- Clade: Tracheophytes
- Clade: Angiosperms
- Clade: Eudicots
- Clade: Asterids
- Order: Ericales
- Family: Ericaceae
- Genus: Rhododendron
- Species: R. racemosum

Binomial name
- Rhododendron racemosum Franch.

Synonyms
- Rhododendron crenatum H.Lév.; Rhododendron motsouense H.Lév.

= Rhododendron racemosum =

Species of flowering plant

Rhododendron racemosum, the racemose rhododendron (Chinese: 腋花杜鹃; pinyin: yèhuā dùjuān), is a species of flowering plant in the heath family Ericaceae, native to forest and grassland at 1,500–3,500 m (4,900–11,500 ft) in northwestern Guizhou, southwestern Sichuan, and Yunnan, China.

== Description ==
It is an upright evergreen shrub growing to 2 m (6.6 ft) tall by 1.5 m (4.9 ft) broad. In early spring it bears masses of pale or deep pink trumpet-shaped flowers, each with up to 10 prominent stamens.

== Cultivation ==
In cultivation in the UK Rhododendron racemosum and the cultivar 'Rock Rose' have gained the Royal Horticultural Society's Award of Garden Merit. It is hardy down to −20 °C (−4 °F) but like most rhododendrons it requires a sheltered spot in dappled shade, and an acid soil enriched with leaf mould.

== Etymology ==
Racemosum means "bearing inflorescences in racemes".

== Gallery ==
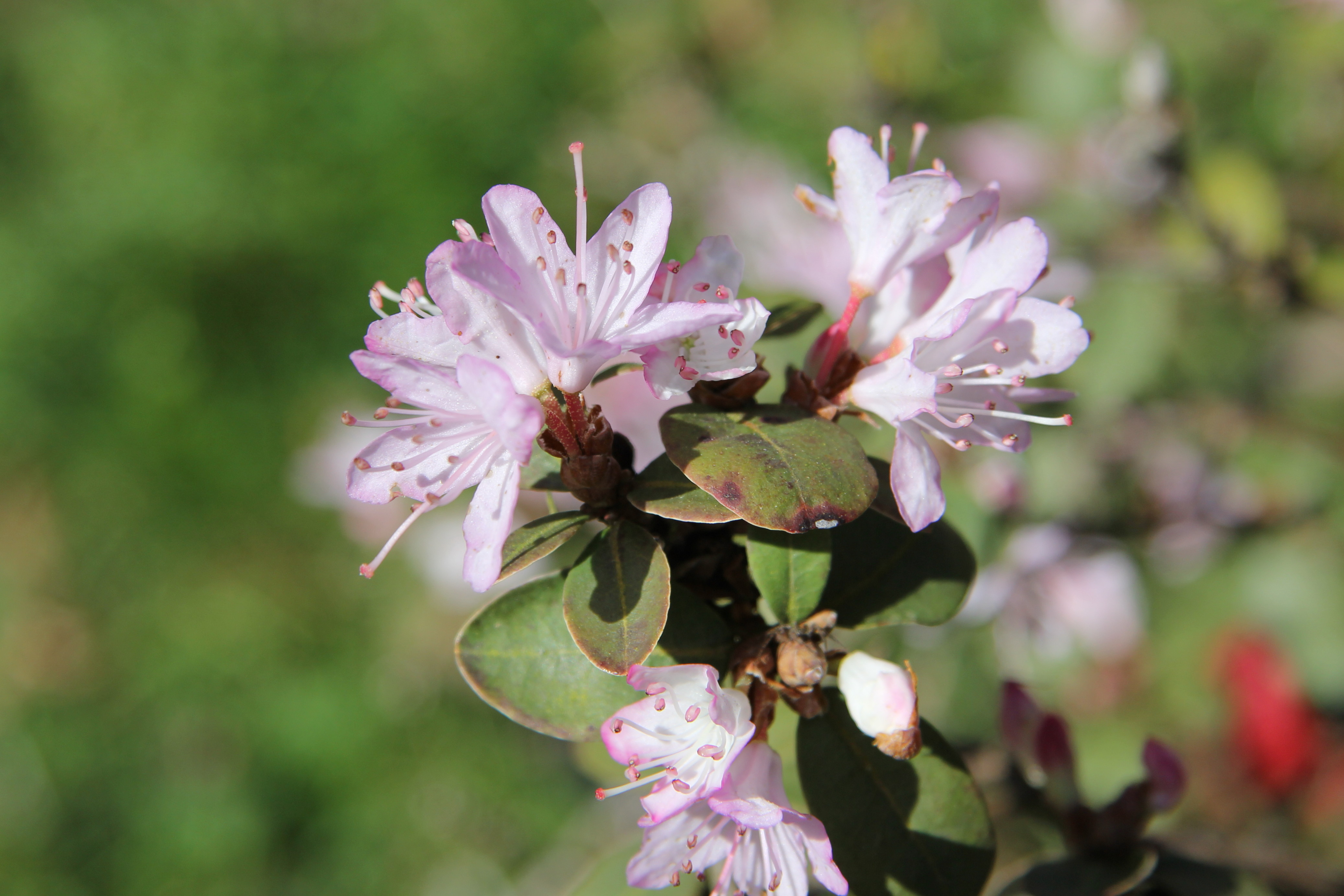

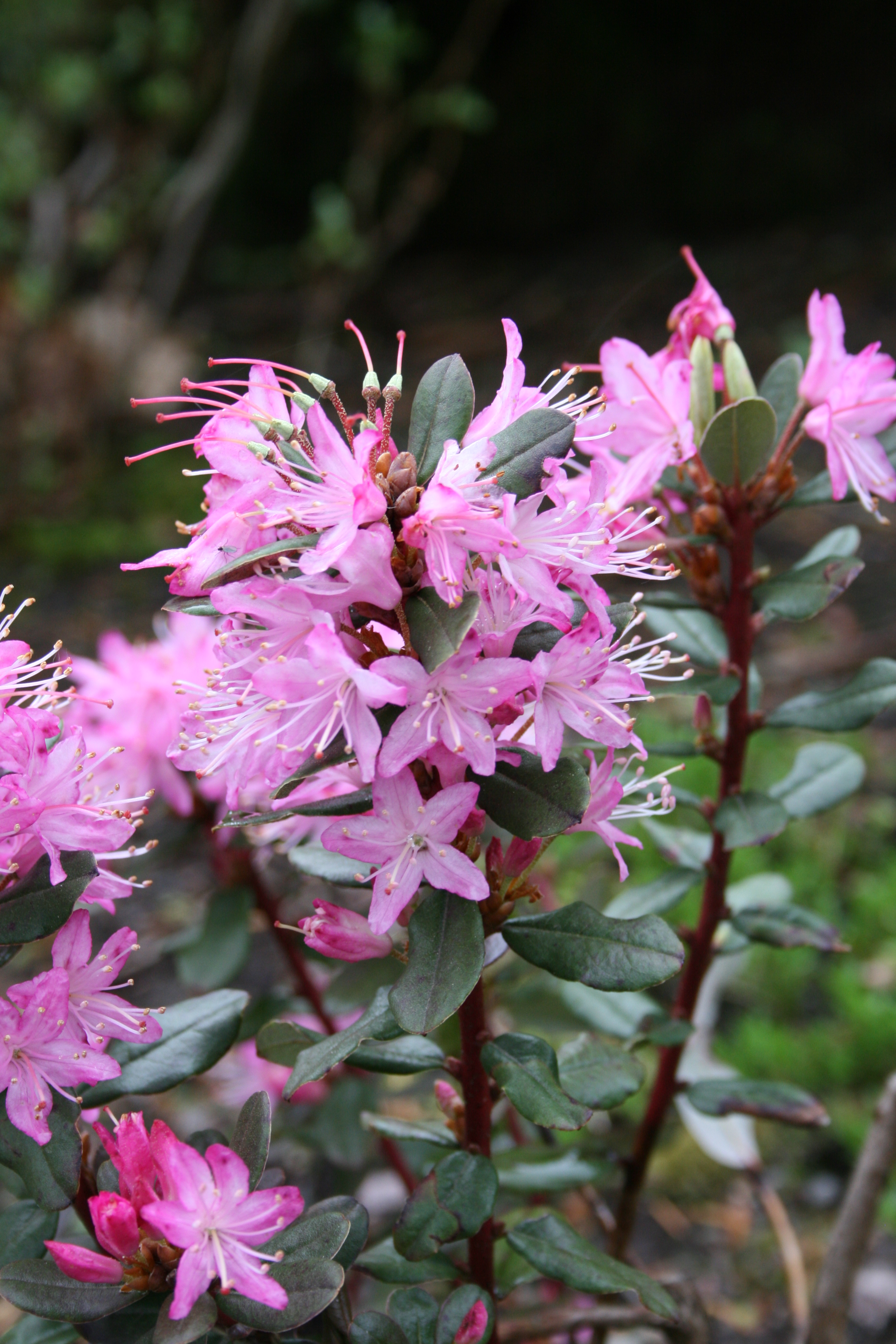

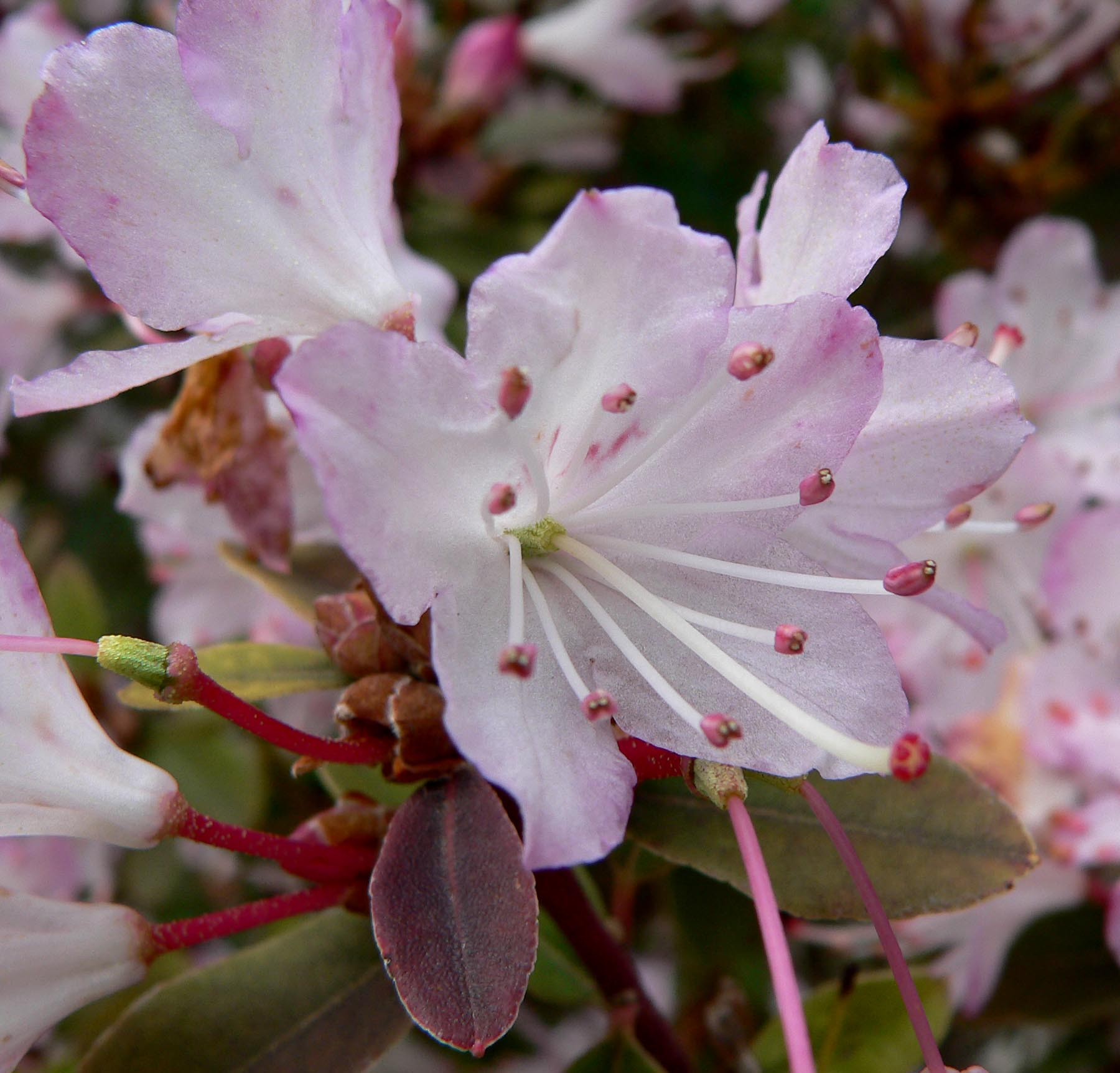
