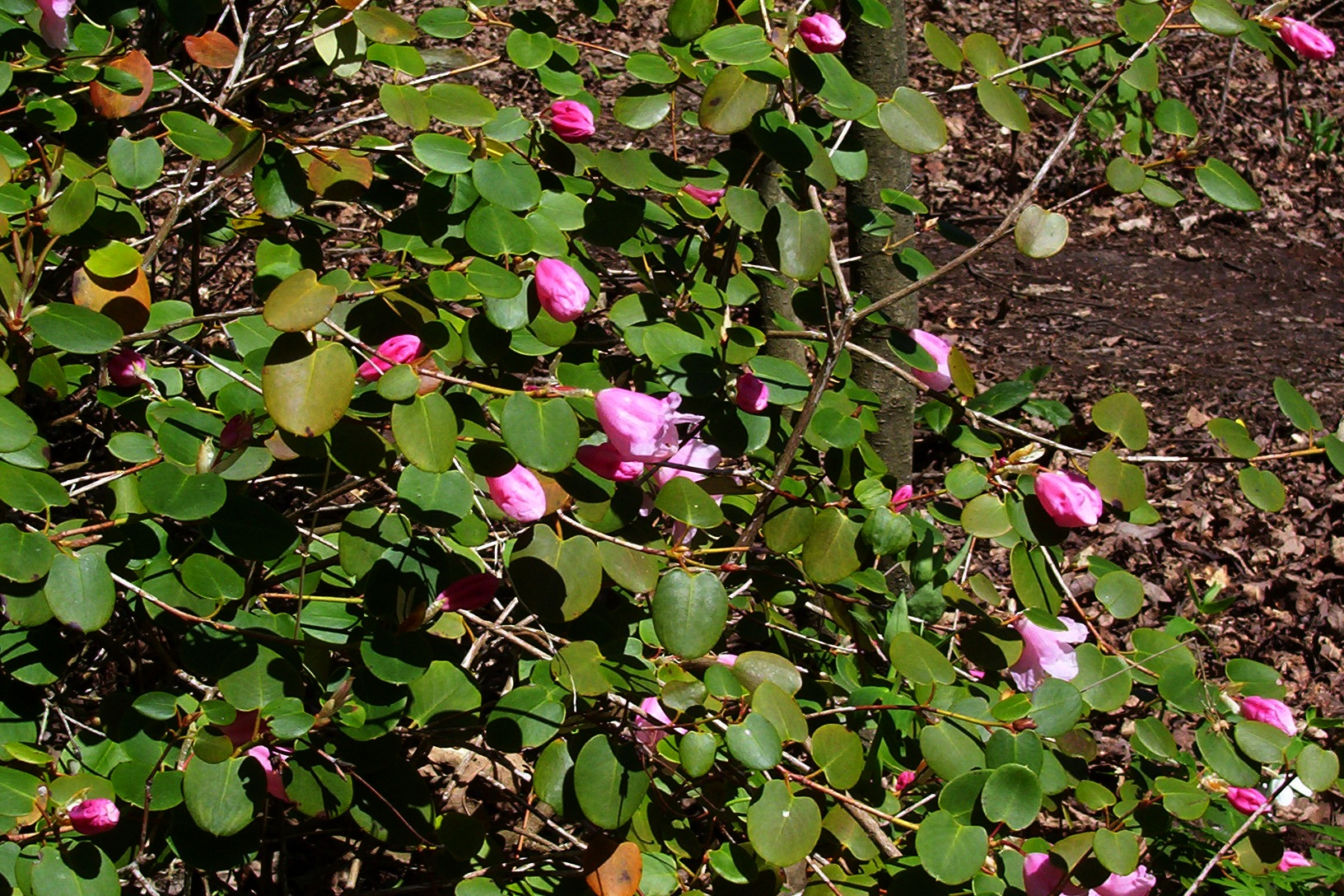

Scientific classification
- Kingdom: Plantae
- Clade: Tracheophytes
- Clade: Angiosperms
- Clade: Eudicots
- Clade: Asterids
- Order: Ericales
- Family: Ericaceae
- Genus: Rhododendron
- Species: R. williamsianum

Binomial name
- Rhododendron williamsianum Rehder & E.H.Wilson

= Rhododendron williamsianum =

Species of flowering plant

Rhododendron williamsianum (Chinese: 圆叶杜鹃; pinyin: yuányè dùjuān), the Williams rhododendron, is a species of flowering plant in the heath family Ericaceae. It is native to forested slopes at 1,800–2,800 m (5,900–9,200 ft) in western Guizhou, southwestern Sichuan, southeastern Xizang and northeastern Yunnan in southern and western China.

Growing to 1.5 m (4.9 ft) tall and broad, it is a compact evergreen shrub with rounded matt green leaves and rose pink bell-shaped flowers in spring.

In cultivation in the UK, Rhododendron williamsianum has gained the Royal Horticultural Society's Award of Garden Merit. It is hardy down to −15 °C (5 °F) but like most rhododendron species requires a sheltered position in dappled shade with acid soil that has been enriched with leaf mould.

The name williamsianum is in honour of the Cornish plantsman John Charles Williams, who developed many shrubs and trees of importance to horticulture.
