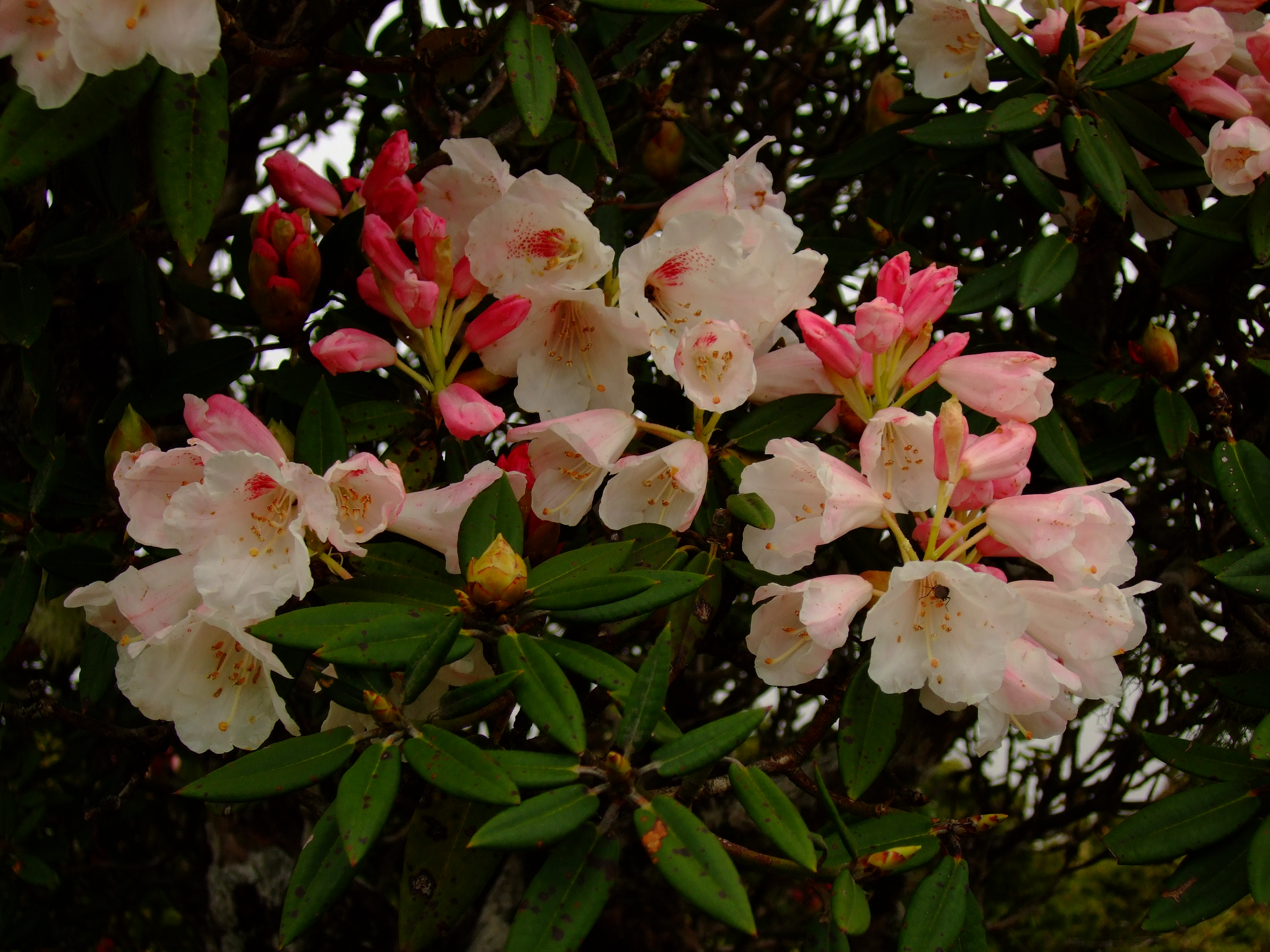

Scientific classification
- Kingdom: Plantae
- Clade: Tracheophytes
- Clade: Angiosperms
- Clade: Eudicots
- Clade: Asterids
- Order: Ericales
- Family: Ericaceae
- Genus: Rhododendron
- Species: R. pseudochrysanthum

Binomial name
- Rhododendron pseudochrysanthum Hayata

= Rhododendron pseudochrysanthum =

Species of flowering plant

Rhododendron pseudochrysanthum (Chinese: 阿里山杜鵑; pinyin: Ālǐshān dùjuān; lit. 'Alishan azalea'), the false-gold-flower rhododendron, is a species of flowering plant in the heath family Ericaceae, native to Taiwan. It is a low-growing evergreen shrub growing to 2.5 m (8.2 ft) tall and broad. In spring, trusses of pink buds appear, opening to pale pink flowers spotted with deeper pink on the inner surface.

In cultivation in the UK Rhododendron pseudochrysanthum has gained the Royal Horticultural Society's Award of Garden Merit. It is hardy down to −20 °C (−4 °F) but like most rhododendrons it requires a sheltered spot in dappled shade, and an acid soil enriched with leaf mould.

== Synonyms ==
- Rhododendron nankotaisanense Hayata
- Rhododendron pseudochrysanthum var. nankotaisanense (Hayata) T. Yamazaki
