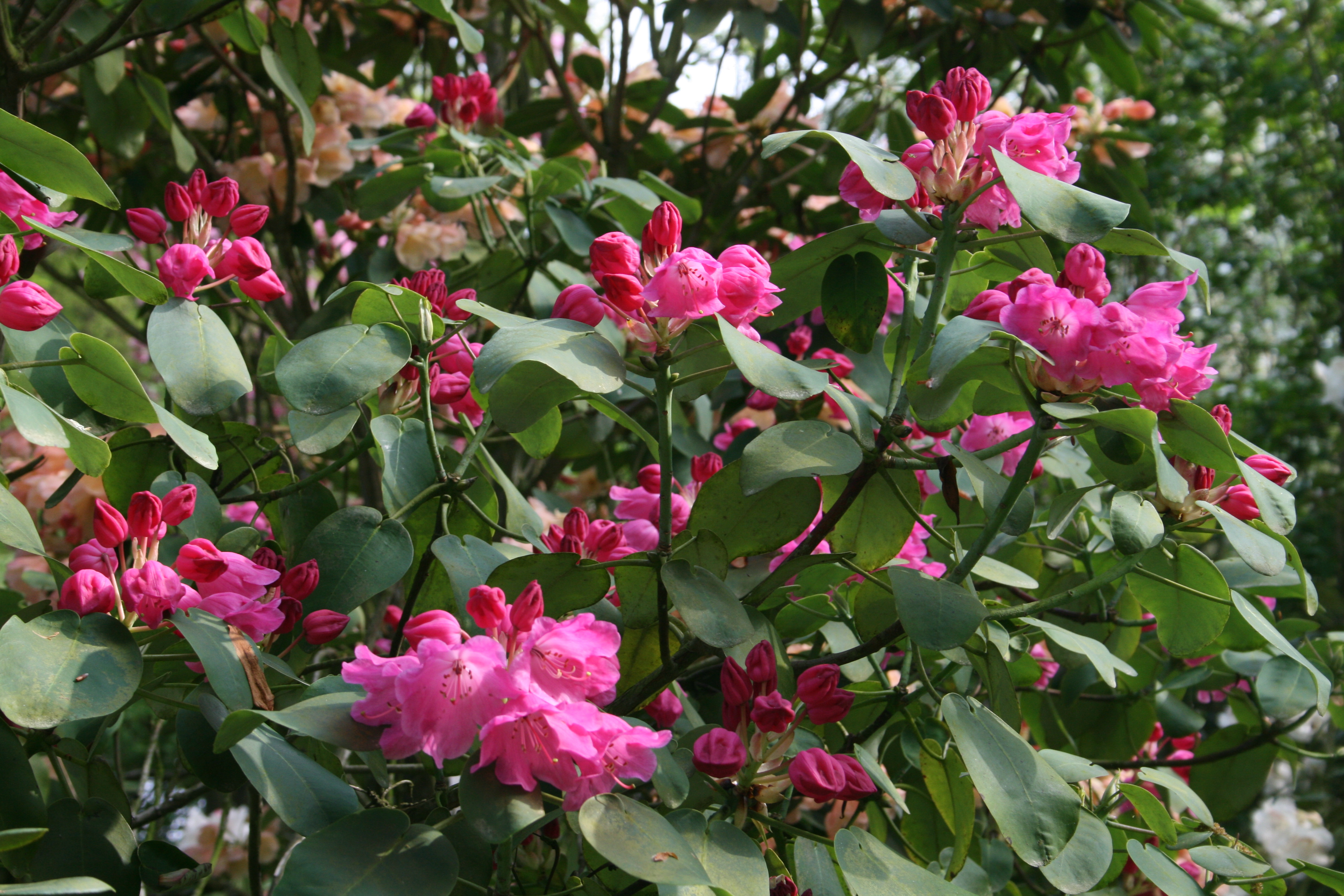

Scientific classification
- Kingdom: Plantae
- Clade: Tracheophytes
- Clade: Angiosperms
- Clade: Eudicots
- Clade: Asterids
- Order: Ericales
- Family: Ericaceae
- Genus: Rhododendron
- Species: R. orbiculare

Binomial name
- Rhododendron orbiculare Decne.

= Rhododendron orbiculare =

Species of flowering plant

Rhododendron orbiculare, the round-leaved rhododendron (Chinese: 团叶杜鹃; pinyin: tuányè dùjuān), is a species of flowering plant in the heath family Ericaceae that is native to forests and slopes at an elevation of 1,400–3,500 m (4,600–11,500 ft) in northeastern Guangxi and southwestern Sichuan, China. It is a compact evergreen shrub growing to 3 m (9.8 ft) tall and broad, with matt-textured round leaves and trusses of deep pink flowers in spring.

In cultivation in the UK Rhododendron orbiculare has gained the Royal Horticultural Society's Award of Garden Merit. It is hardy down to −15 °C (5 °F) but like most rhododendrons it requires a sheltered spot in dappled shade, and an acid soil enriched with leaf mould.
