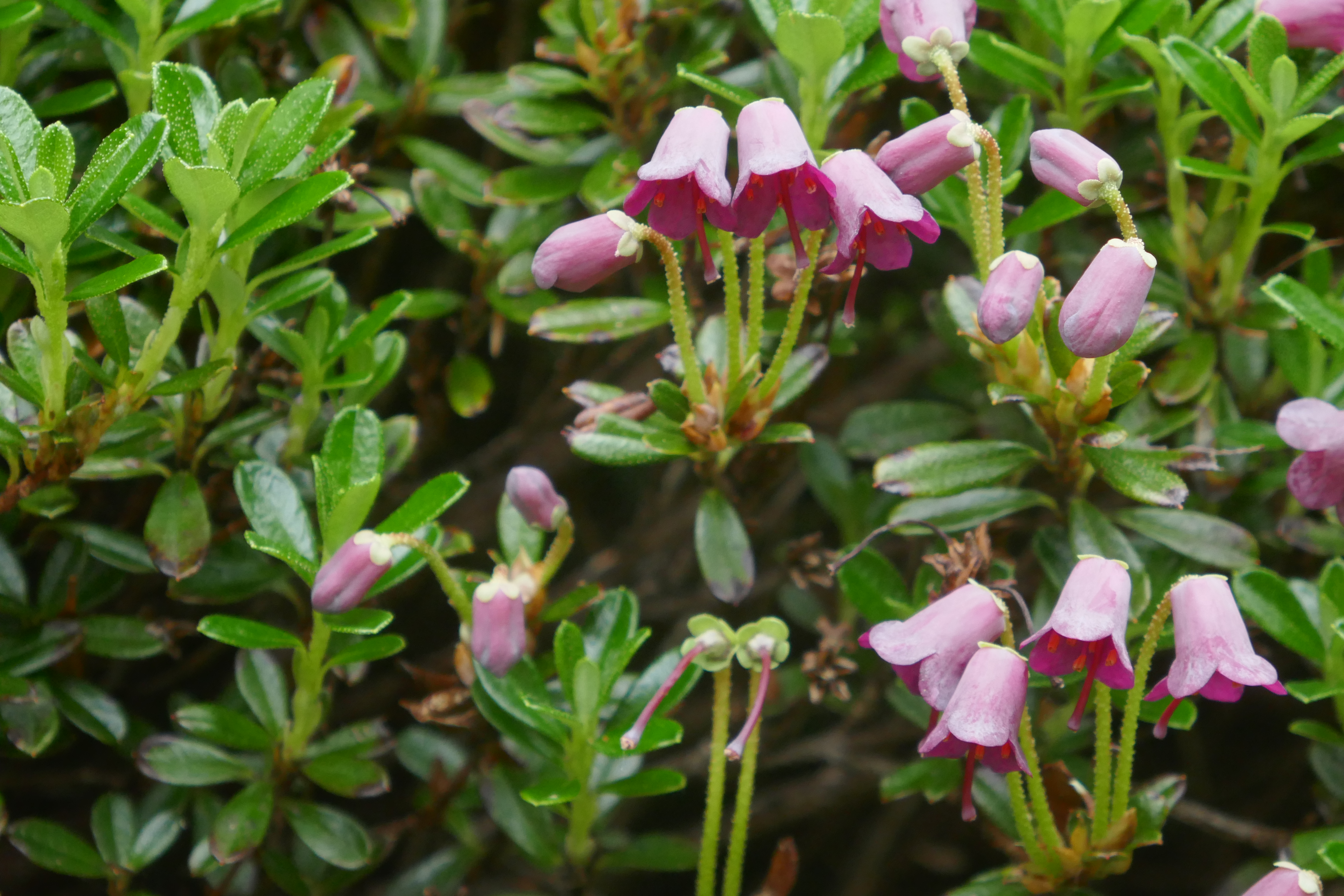
- R. campylogynum 'Myrtilloides'

Scientific classification
- Kingdom: Plantae
- Clade: Tracheophytes
- Clade: Angiosperms
- Clade: Eudicots
- Clade: Asterids
- Order: Ericales
- Family: Ericaceae
- Genus: Rhododendron
- Species: R. campylogynum

Binomial name
- Rhododendron campylogynum Franch

Synonyms
- Rhododendron caeruleoglaucum; Rhododendron campylogynum var. celsum; Rhododendron campylogynum var. cremastum; Rhododendron cremastum; Rhododendron damascenum; Rhododendron glaucoaureum; Rhododendron myrtilloides

= Rhododendron campylogynum =

Species of flowering bush

Rhododendron campylogynum (独龙杜鹃), the bent-style rhododendron, is a rhododendron species native to northeast India and northeast Myanmar, where it grows at altitudes of 3,500–4,500 m (11,500–14,800 ft). It is a small creeping or prostrate shrub that grows 0.5–3 cm (0.20–1.18 in) in height, with leathery leaves, obovate to obovate-lanceolate in shape, up to 2.5 cm by 1.5 cm but often much smaller. The leaves are glandular and are strongly scented of myrrh when crushed. The flowers are purplish red or pink colour and of a distinctive simple, somewhat nodding, bell shape, borne singly or in pairs on a short stalk.

In cultivation in the UK the Myrtilloides cultivar group has gained the Royal Horticultural Society's Award of Garden Merit.
