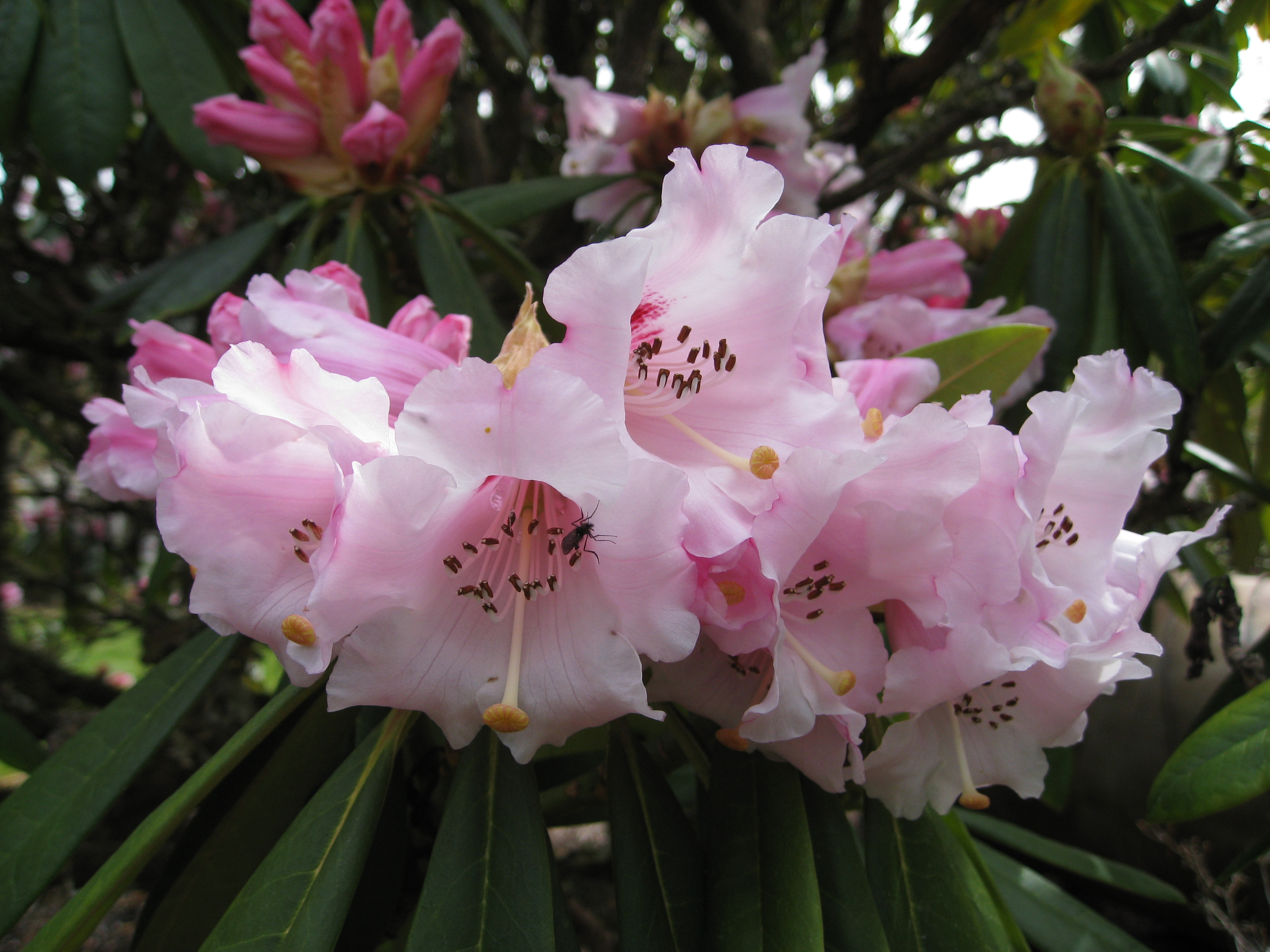

Scientific classification
- Kingdom: Plantae
- Clade: Tracheophytes
- Clade: Angiosperms
- Clade: Eudicots
- Clade: Asterids
- Order: Ericales
- Family: Ericaceae
- Genus: Rhododendron
- Subsection: Rhododendron subsect. Fortunea
- Species: R. calophytum

Binomial name
- Rhododendron calophytum Franch.

Varieties
- Rhododendron calophytum var. calophytum; Rhododendron calophytum var. jinfuense W.P.Fang & W.K.Hu; Rhododendron calophytum var. openshawianum (Rehder & E.H.Wilson) D.F.Chamb.; Rhododendron calophytum var. pauciflorum W.K.Hu

= Rhododendron calophytum =

Species of flowering plant

Rhododendron calophytum, the beautiful-face rhododendron (Chinese: 美容杜鹃; pinyin: Měiróng dùjuān), is an evergreen shrub or small tree in the family Ericaceae. It is endemic to China and is mainly distributed in Shaanxi, Gansu, Hubei, Sichuan, Guizhou, and Yunnan. Its specific epithet calophytum derives from Greek and means "beautiful plant".

In cultivation in the UK, Rhododendron calophytum has gained the Royal Horticultural Society's Award of Garden Merit.

The species plays an important role in maintaining alpine ecological balance. Because it contains abundant volatile aromatic compounds and diverse anthocyanins, it has high potential economic value for ornamental horticulture, perfumery, and medicinal development.

== History ==
In 1869, the French missionary and plant hunter Armand David first discovered and collected specimens of the species in Baoxing County (Muping), Sichuan. In 1886, the French botanist Adrien René Franchet formally described and named it in the Bulletin de la Société Botanique de France. In 1904, the British plant hunter Ernest Henry Wilson introduced its seeds to Veitch Nurseries in England. Later, during his tenure at the Arnold Arboretum, Wilson introduced it to the United States, where it became widely propagated in Western horticulture.

== Description ==
Rhododendron calophytum usually grows 2–12 m tall, with stout young branches covered in white tomentum. The leaves are thickly leathery, oblong-oblanceolate or oblong-lanceolate, up to 11–30 cm long, dark green adaxially, and with yellowish to grayish-white tomentum abaxially. The terminal racemose-umbellate inflorescence bears 15–30 flowers; the corolla is broadly campanulate, 4–5.8 cm long, white, pink, or purplish-red, with a conspicuous dark purple-red blotch above the base inside. The calyx is small, and there are 15–22 stamens. The capsule is cylindrical. Flowering occurs in April–May, and fruiting in September–October.

Illustrated by Lilian Snelling

== Varieties ==
Taxonomically, Flora of China and Plants of the World Online (POWO) currently recognize four varieties:

Variety	Scientific name	Morphological differences and distribution.
Original variety	R. calophytum var. calophytum	Leaves oblanceolate or oblong-lanceolate, 11–30 cm; racemose-umbellate inflorescence with 15–30 flowers. Distributed in Shaanxi, Gansu, Hubei, Sichuan, Guizhou, Yunnan, and nearby areas; grows in forests at 1,300–4,000 m.
Few-flowered variety	R. calophytum var. pauciflorum	Leaves broadly oblanceolate to oblong; rachis shorter; flowers few (only 3–7). Distributed in southeastern Sichuan; the type specimen was collected at Jinfoshan, Nanchuan, Chongqing.
Pointed-leaf variety	R. calophytum var. openshawianum	Leaves smaller and narrower, apex caudate-acuminate; flowers 6–12. Distributed in western and southwestern Sichuan and northeastern Yunnan; grows on rocky sites or in forests at 1,400–2,800 m.
Jinfoshan variety	R. calophytum var. jinfuense	Leaves smaller, 10–14 cm; flowers smaller, corolla purple, lobes 5. Distributed in southeastern Sichuan; the type specimen was collected at Jinfoshan, Nanchuan.

== Ecological adaptations ==
Rhododendron calophytum mostly grows in cool high-altitude environments at 1,300–4,000 m. Studies have shown that it has distinctive physiological responses to environmental stress. When coping with soil calcium loss caused by long-term acid deposition, it can maintain stable calcium concentrations in leaves and xylem, showing stronger stress resistance than the sympatric Abies fabri; this is related to the shallow root system and mycorrhizal symbiosis characteristic of Ericaceae. In addition, under heat shock, low-temperature, and salt stress, the heat shock transcription factor gene RcHsfB3 shows an alternating "up-down" expression pattern, regulating the synthesis of downstream stress-resistance proteins. After being introduced to low-altitude areas, its net photosynthetic rate increased, and the peroxidase activity increased significantly. Its overall physiological response to low-altitude transplantation was lower than that of Rhododendron hunnewellianum, suggesting that it is relatively more suitable for introduction and domestication at low altitudes.

== Propagation ==
Wild Rhododendron calophytum seeds are very small, have a low natural germination rate, and traditional cutting propagation roots slowly. Modern botany has successfully established a leaf regeneration system through plant tissue culture, laying a foundation for large-scale clonal propagation. For sexual propagation, studies have found that soaking seeds in gibberellic acid (GA_{3}) can significantly break dormancy and increase the germination rate. In addition, rice-husk charcoal extract at a specific concentration can effectively promote seed germination and shorten the germination lag.

== Chemical constituents ==
The flowers of Rhododendron calophytum are rich in volatile essential oil. Gas chromatography–mass spectrometry (GC-MS) analysis identified 54 compounds in the floral volatile oil, with major components including N-phenyl-1-naphthylamine, linalool, methyl linolenate, and palmitic acid. Among these, linalool was isolated from a Rhododendron species for the first time and has important perfumery and medicinal value. Regarding petal coloration, the color change from white to purple is mainly attributed to the accumulation of anthocyanins (especially cyanidin galactoside), while other flavonoids assist in color enhancement.

== Conservation status ==
According to The Red List of Rhododendrons published by Botanic Gardens Conservation International (BGCI) in 2011, the original variety (var. calophytum) and the pointed-leaf variety (var. openshawianum) are assessed as Least Concern (LC) because of their relatively wide distributions. However, the Jinfoshan variety (var. jinfuense) and the few-flowered variety (var. pauciflorum) are both listed as Vulnerable (VU D1/D2). All known wild populations of these two varieties are restricted to very few forest sites at Jinfoshan, Chongqing. In the China Biodiversity Red List: Higher Plants (2020), jointly released by the Ministry of Ecology and Environment and the Chinese Academy of Sciences in 2023, the original variety and the pointed-leaf variety are also assessed as Least Concern (LC); the Jinfoshan variety is listed as Near Threatened (NT, criterion D); and the few-flowered variety is listed as Critically Endangered (CR, criteria B1ab(i,ii,iii); C1).

ISSR molecular marker studies have shown that wild populations of Rhododendron calophytum in the Qinling Mountains have high genetic diversity, with genetic variation mainly occurring within populations. To maximize protection of its genetic resources, scholars recommend in situ conservation while prioritizing strict protection of the genetically diverse Zhen'an Muwang and Zhashui Niubeiliang populations, supplemented by ex situ conservation measures. In addition, chloroplast genome sequencing completed in 2022 showed that the genome is long, and phylogenetic analysis indicates that it is most closely related to Rhododendron platypodum.
