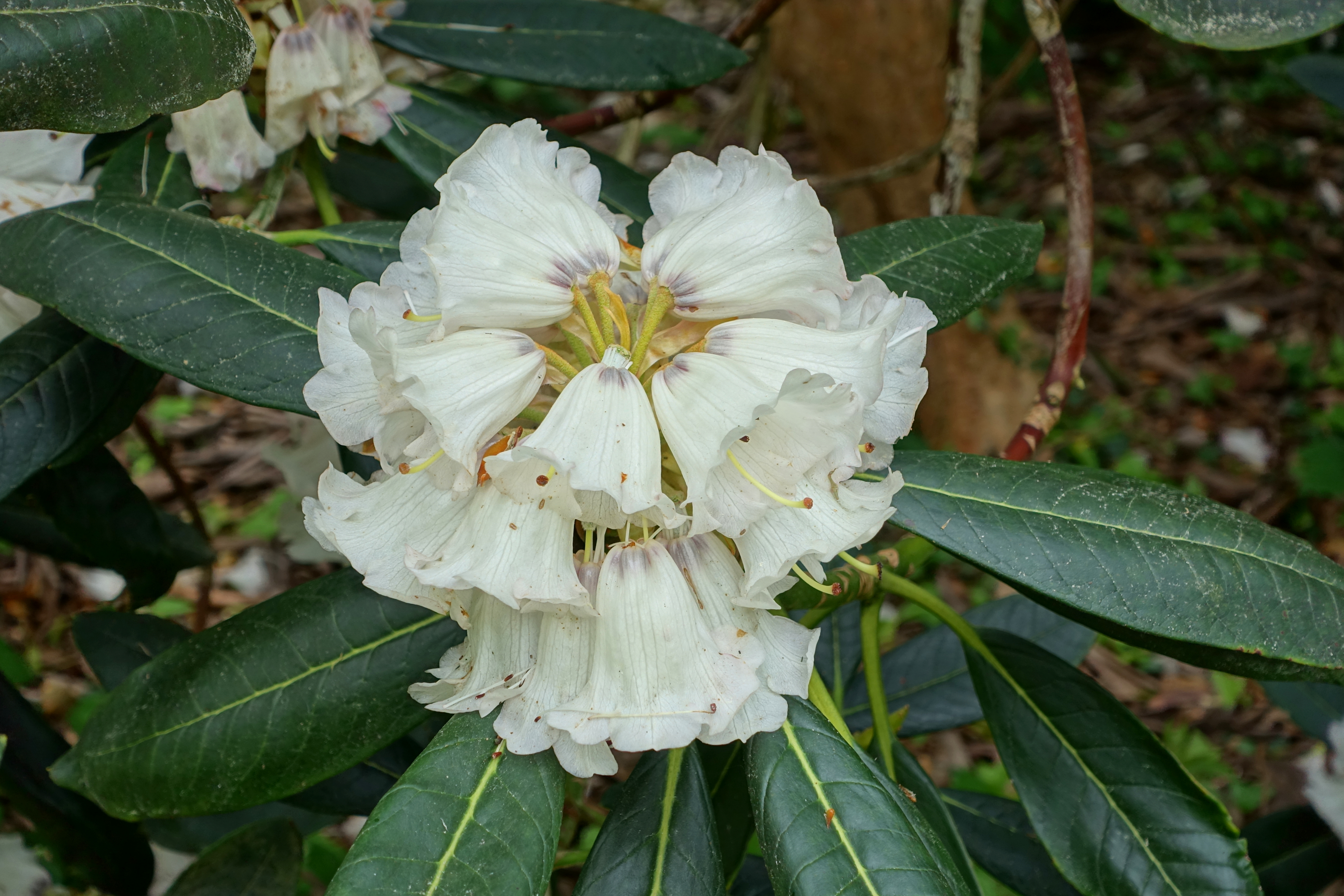

Conservation status
- Near Threatened (IUCN 2.3)

Scientific classification
- Kingdom: Plantae
- Clade: Tracheophytes
- Clade: Angiosperms
- Clade: Eudicots
- Clade: Asterids
- Order: Ericales
- Family: Ericaceae
- Genus: Rhododendron
- Species: R. rex

Binomial name
- Rhododendron rex H.Lév.

= Rhododendron rex =

Species of plant

Rhododendron rex (大王杜鹃), the king rhododendron, is a tree species, usually 5–8 m (16–26 ft) in height, in the family Ericaceae. It is found in China, India, and Myanmar, where it is threatened by habitat loss. The flowers are creamy-white, or pale yellow to pink, with a crimson basal blotch. The leaves are 17–27 cm in length and are covered on the underside with an indumentum that ranges in colour from greyish to rusty brown.

The Royal Horticultural Society describes Rhododendron rex and its subspecies as very large shrubs or trees, reaching 12 m (39 ft) in cultivation. Three of them have received the RHS Award of Garden Merit:-

- Rhododendron rex
- Rhododendron rex subsp. fictolacteum
- Rhododendron rex subsp. rex

There is a further named subspecies, Rhododendron rex subsp. gratum. All are hardy down to −15 °C (5 °F), but like most rhododendrons they require a sheltered position in dappled shade, and acid soil enriched with leaf mould.
