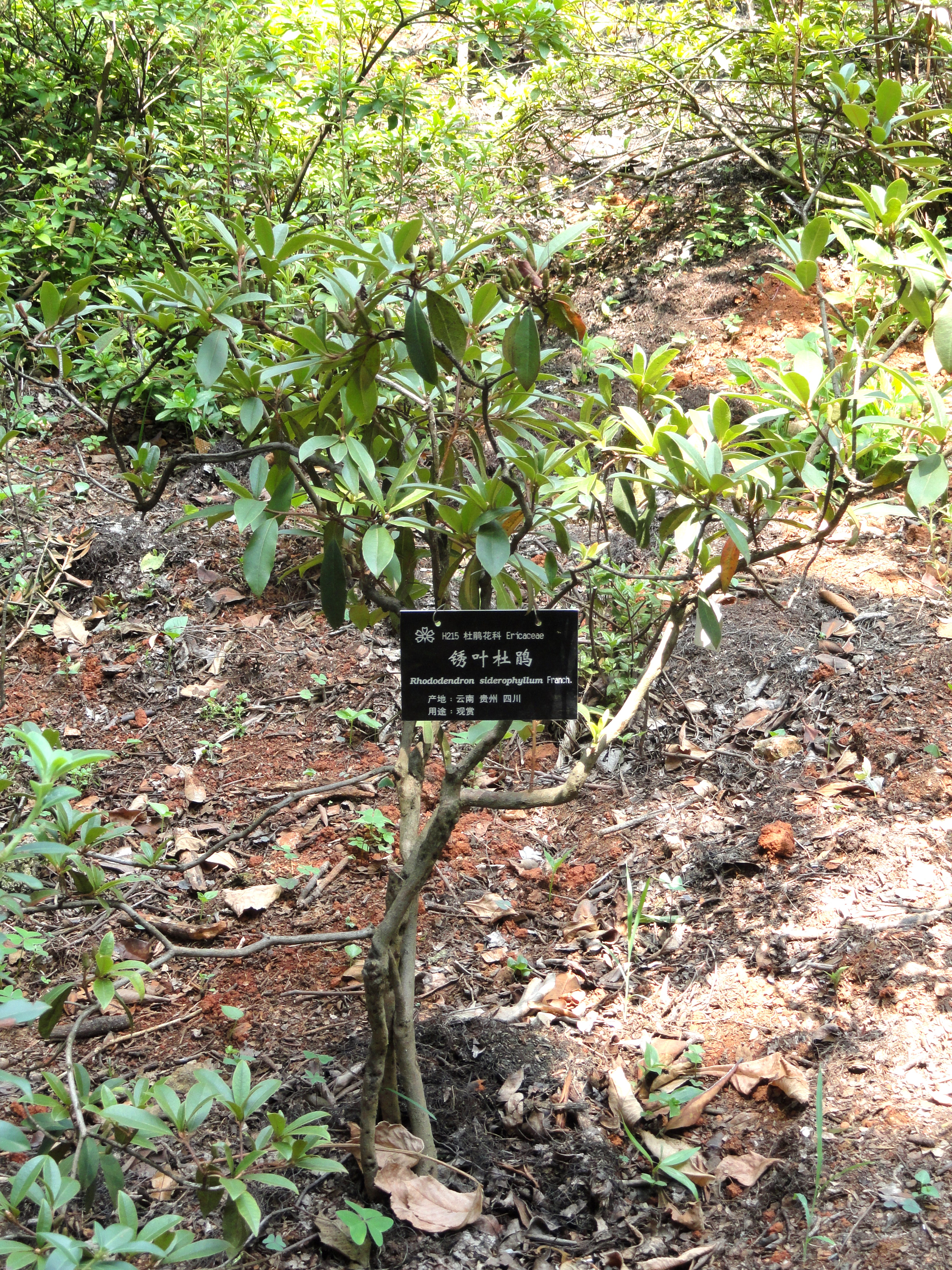

Scientific classification
- Kingdom: Plantae
- Clade: Tracheophytes
- Clade: Angiosperms
- Clade: Eudicots
- Clade: Asterids
- Order: Ericales
- Family: Ericaceae
- Genus: Rhododendron
- Subgenus: Rhododendron subg. Rhododendron
- Section: Rhododendron sect. Rhododendron
- Species: R. siderophyllum

Binomial name
- Rhododendron siderophyllum Franch.

Synonyms
- Rhododendron ioanthum Balf.f.; Rhododendron jahandiezii H.Lév.; Rhododendron leucandrum H.Lév.; Rhododendron obscurum Franch. ex Balf.f.; Rhododendron seguinii H.Lév.

= Rhododendron siderophyllum =

Species of plant

Rhododendron siderophyllum is a rhododendron species native to Guizhou, Sichuan and Yunnan, China, where it grows at altitudes of 1,800–3,000 m (5,900–9,800 ft). It is a shrub that grows to 1–4 m (3–13 ft) in height, with leaves that are elliptic or elliptic-lanceolate, 3–7 cm (1.2–2.8 in) long by 1.2–3.5 cm (0.5–1.4 in) wide. Flowers range from white to pink to pale purple or red. It is placed in section Rhododendron.
