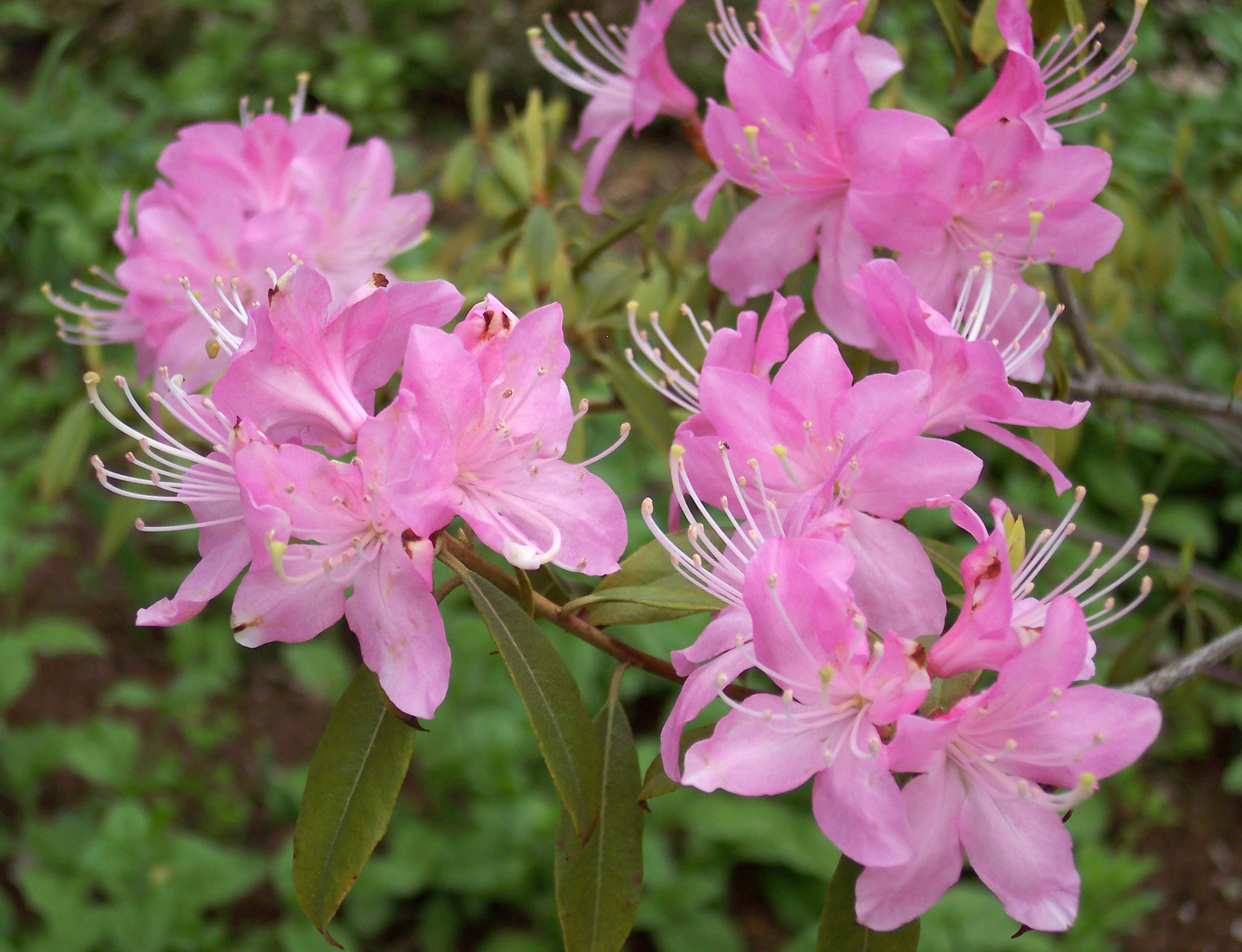
- cv. 'Ruth Lyon'

Scientific classification
- Kingdom: Plantae
- Clade: Tracheophytes
- Clade: Angiosperms
- Clade: Eudicots
- Clade: Asterids
- Order: Ericales
- Family: Ericaceae
- Genus: Rhododendron
- Species: R. davidsonianum

Binomial name
- Rhododendron davidsonianum Rehder & E.H.Wilson (1913)

Synonyms
- Rhododendron charianthum Hutch.

= Rhododendron davidsonianum =

Species of flowering plant

Rhododendron davidsonianum, the concave-leaf rhododendron, is a species of flowering plant in the heath family Ericaceae that is native to the forests of Sichuan, China, where it lives at elevations of 1,500–2,800 m (4,900–9,200 ft). Growing to 4 m (13 ft) tall and 2.5 m (8.2 ft) broad, it is an upright evergreen shrub. The glossy leaves are lanceolate and up to 6 cm (2.4 in) long. In spring trusses of bell-shaped, pale pink or purple flowers are produced.

In cultivation in the UK, Rhododendron davidsonianum has gained the Royal Horticultural Society's Award of Garden Merit. Like most rhododendrons it prefers an acid soil. It is hardy down to −15 °C (5 °F).
