= Leaf mold =

Product of slow decomposition of deciduous leaves

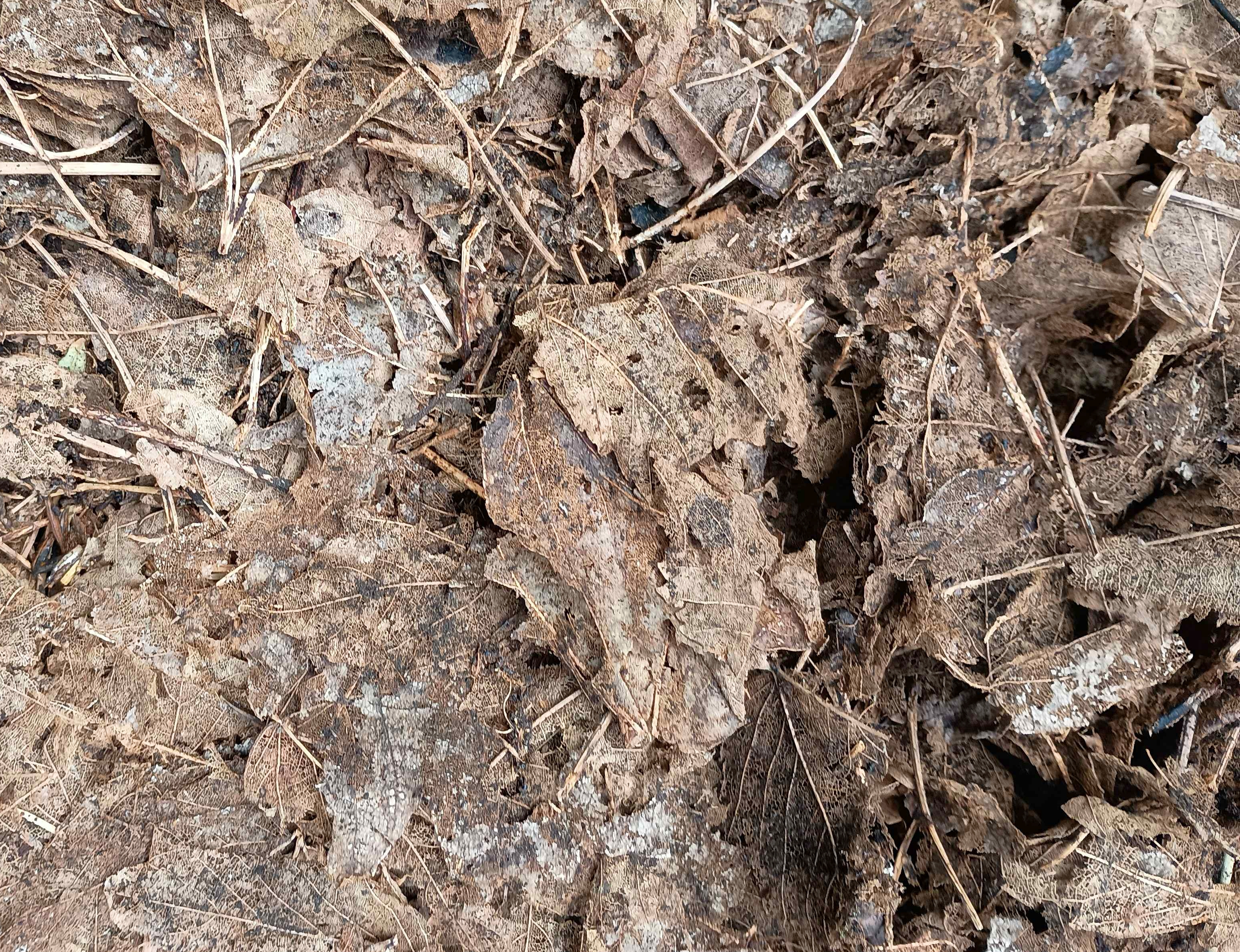
Leaf mold

Leaf mold (spelled leaf mould outside of the United States) is the compost produced by decomposition of shaded deciduous shrub and tree leaves, primarily by fungal breakdown in a slower, cooler manner as opposed to the bacterial degradation of leaves.

== Description ==
Leaves shed in autumn tend to have a very low nitrogen content and are often dry. Their main constituents, cellulose and lignin, are two recalcitrant molecules resistant to degradation. Because of this, autumn leaves break down far more slowly than most other compost ingredients which may take a very long time on their own. Specialised biota, such as molds, produce extracellular enzymes which can easily break down those complex plant polymers(cellulose, lignin and hemicellulose) into biologically accessible forms enriching the soil environment.

The importance of this decomposition of the leaves and other shed plant litter is that their degradation and decomposition forms a critical step in the mineralization of organic nutrients and their recycling.

== Time and process ==
Fungal decomposition of a heap of leaves in damp temperate climates can take between one and three years to break down into a dark brown fine powdery humic matter. A succession of different fungal species may be involved. A range of micro detritivores are also involved in converting the leaf material into a fine-grained humus, including many isopods, millipedes, earthworms, etc.

== Uses ==
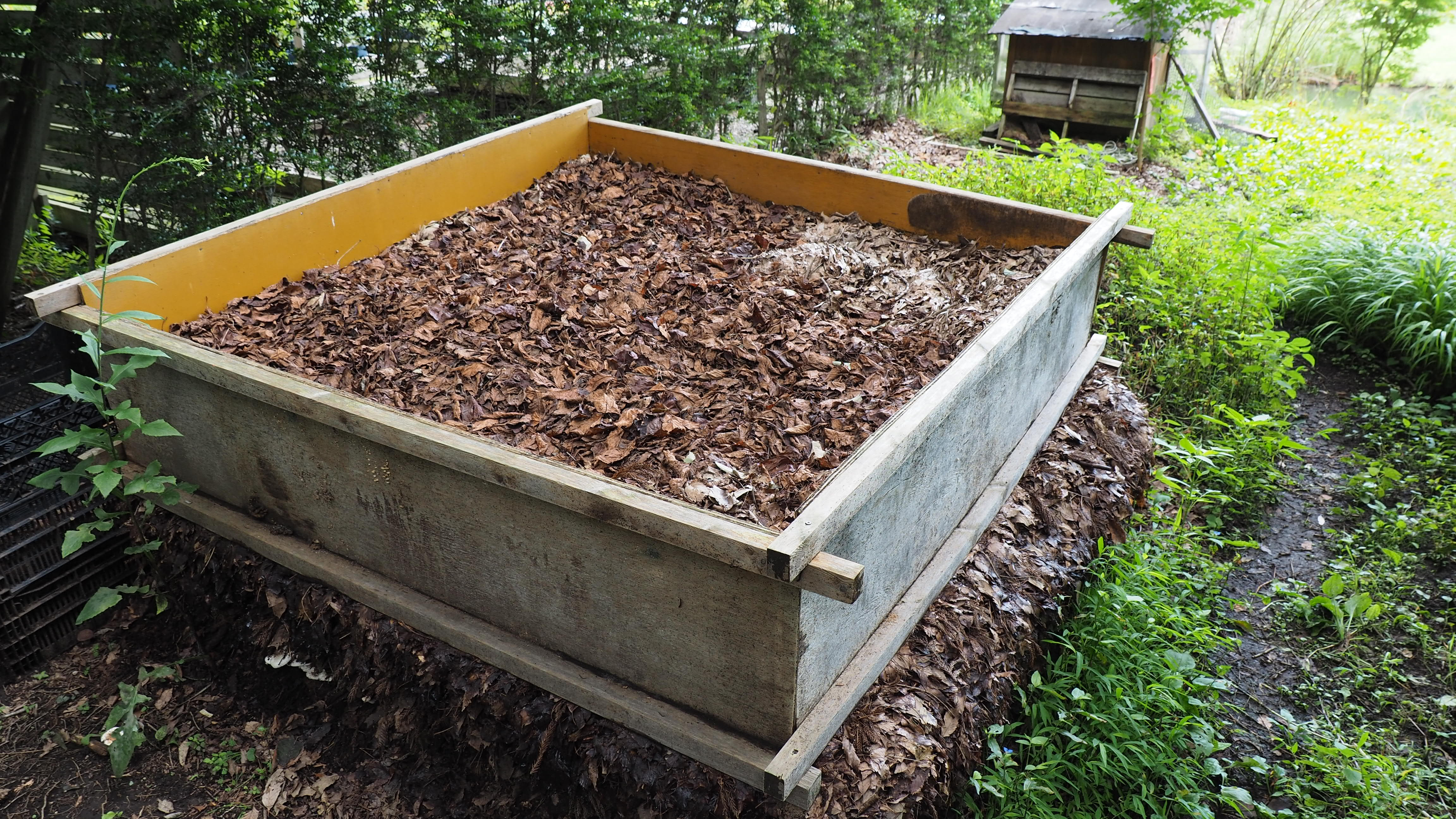
A compost heap of collected leaves, to produce leaf mold

In the natural environment, the decomposition of leaves provides a moist growing medium for young plants and protects the ground from drying out during periods of low rainfall. It is a significant component of soil organic matter, particularly in temperate deciduous woodland. The slow rate of decomposition gradually releases plant nutrients bound up in the leaves back into the environment to be re-used by plants. Autumn leaves are often collected in gardens and farms into pits or containers for the resultant leaf mold to be used later.

Oxygen and moisture are essential for leaf decomposition. Leaf mold is not high in nutrient content but is an excellent humic soil conditioner because its structure and moisture retention provide a good growing medium for seedling roots.

Leaves collected from roads and pavements may be contaminated by pollutants which can become more concentrated as the leaves decompose into a smaller volume

== See also ==
- Worm compost
- Spent mushroom compost
- Recycling
