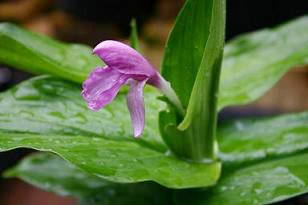

Scientific classification
- Kingdom: Plantae
- Clade: Tracheophytes
- Clade: Angiosperms
- Clade: Monocots
- Clade: Commelinids
- Order: Zingiberales
- Family: Zingiberaceae
- Genus: Roscoea
- Species: R. australis

Binomial name
- Roscoea australis Cowley

= Roscoea australis =

Species of flowering plant

Roscoea australis is a perennial herbaceous plant found in Burma, to the south of all other members of the genus. Most members of the ginger family (Zingiberaceae), to which it belongs, are tropical, but R. australis, like other species of Roscoea, grows in much colder mountainous regions.

== Description ==
Roscoea australis is a perennial herbaceous plant. Like all members of the genus Roscoea, it dies back each year to a short vertical rhizome, to which are attached the tuberous roots. When growth begins again, "pseudostems" are produced: structures which resemble stems but are actually formed from the tightly wrapped bases (sheaths) of its leaves. Plants are usually 11–16 cm (4.3–6.3 in) tall, occasionally up to 30 cm (12 in), with four to six leaves. The first two or three consist only of whitish sheaths, which may be speckled; the remaining leaves form a rosette and have blades usually 6–10 cm (2.4–3.9 in) long by 2–3 cm (0.8–1.2 in) wide (although lengths and widths outside this range are also found). The sheaths have small 'ears' (auriculate) at the junction of the blade and sheath where there is also a small ligule which extends to about 1.5 mm (0.1 in).

Flowers appear in May to July in the wild. The stem (peduncle) of the flower spike (inflorescence) is held within the leaves. The few flowers open one at a time and are purple or white. The bracts which subtend the flowers are shorter than the calyx. Each flower has the typical structure for Roscoea (see the diagrams in that article). There is a tube-shaped outer calyx which is spotted and pink-brown in colour, with a bluntly three-lobed apex. Next inwards the three petals (the corolla) form a white tube, protruding considerably from the calyx, terminating in three lobes, a hooded upright central lobe, about 2.2–3 cm (0.9–1.2 in) long by 1.7–2 cm (0.7–0.8 in) wide, and two narrower side lobes, about 1.9–2.6 cm (0.75–1.02 in) long by about 6–8 mm (0.2–0.3 in) wide, which are whitish at the base. Inside the petals are structures formed from four sterile stamens (staminodes): two lateral staminodes form what appear to be small upright purple petals, which are 1.3–2.2 cm (0.5–0.9 in) by 6–9 mm (0.2–0.4 in), with a non-central vein; two central staminodes are partially fused at the base to form a lip or labellum, 2–3 cm (0.8–1.2 in) long by about 1.9–2.4 cm (0.7–0.9 in) wide. The labellum is split into two lobes at the end for about half of its length.

The single functional stamen has a white anther, about 5–6 mm (0.2 in) long, with 6–7 mm (0.2–0.3 in) long spurs formed from the connective tissue between the two capsules of the anther. The seeds when they form are dark brown.

== Taxonomy ==
Roscoea australis was first described scientifically by Elizabeth Jill Cowley, a botanist at the Royal Botanic Gardens, Kew, in 1982. The specific epithet australis means "southern"; the species occurs to the south of all other members of the genus. The type specimen was collected in 1956 by Frank Kingdon-Ward from Nat Ma Taung (Mt Victoria) at 2,800 m (9,200 ft) and is held at Kew.

== Evolution and phylogeny ==
The family Zingiberaceae is mainly tropical in occurrence. The unusual mountainous distribution of Roscoea may have evolved relatively recently in response to the uplift taking place in the region in the last 50 million years or so due to the collision of the Indian and Asian tectonic plates.

Species of Roscoea divide into two clear groups, a Himalayan clade and a "Chinese" clade (which includes some species from outside China). The two clades correspond to a geographical separation, their main distributions being divided by the Brahmaputra River as it flows south at the end of the Himalayan mountain chain. It has been suggested that the genus may have originated in this area and then spread westwards along the Himalayas and eastwards into the mountains of China and its southern neighbours. R. australis falls into the Chinese clade as would be expected from its Burmese origin. It is similar to two members of this clade, R. tibetica and R. wardii. It differs from both in possessing a corolla tube which protrudes considerably from the sheathing leaves; in addition, it has a broader upper petal lobe than R. tibetica and smaller flowers than R. wardii.

== Distribution and habitat ==
Roscoea australis occurs in Chin State, Burma, growing at altitudes of 2,100–2,800 m (6,900–9,200 ft) in grassland and on mountain ridges in the Chin Hills, including Nat Ma Taung (Mt Victoria), where the plant collector Frank Kingdon-Ward in his last expedition in 1956 described it as being abundant on the southern face of the ridge of the mountain. It has also been reported to be an epiphyte. It is isolated from other species of the genus by some 200–300 km (120–190 mi). (Note: Distance calculated using Calculate distance, bearing and more between Latitude/Longitude points given a distance of "3–4 degrees of latitude" in Cowley (1982) and the latitude and longitude of the Chin Hills (22.5°N, 93.5°E).)

== Cultivation ==
R. australis has been described as "not the easiest to grow" when in cultivation at the Royal Botanic Garden Edinburgh. Only seedlings were being grown at the Royal Botanic Gardens, Kew when Richard Wilford wrote an account of the cultivation of the genus, saying that Roscoea species generally require a relatively sunny position with moisture-retaining but well-drained soil. As they do not appear above ground until late spring or even early summer, they escape frost damage in regions where subzero temperatures occur.

For propagation, see Roscoea § Cultivation.
