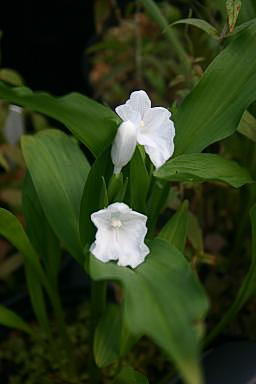
- In cultivation

Scientific classification
- Kingdom: Plantae
- Clade: Tracheophytes
- Clade: Angiosperms
- Clade: Monocots
- Clade: Commelinids
- Order: Zingiberales
- Family: Zingiberaceae
- Genus: Roscoea
- Species: R. nepalensis

Binomial name
- Roscoea nepalensis Cowley

= Roscoea nepalensis =

Species of flowering plant

Roscoea nepalensis is a perennial herbaceous plant found in Nepal. Most members of the ginger family (Zingiberaceae), to which it belongs, are tropical, but R. nepalensis, like other species of Roscoea, grows in much colder mountainous regions.

== Description ==
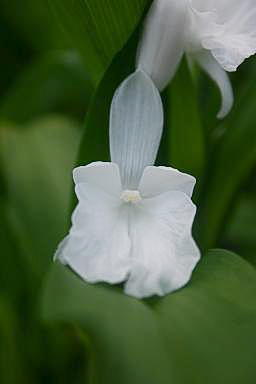
Flower of R. nepalensis, in cultivation

Roscoea nepalensis is a perennial herbaceous plant. Like all members of the genus Roscoea, it dies back each year to a short vertical rhizome, to which are attached the tuberous roots. When growth begins again, "pseudostems" are produced: structures which resemble stems but are actually formed from the tightly wrapped bases (sheaths) of its leaves. Plants are usually 10–26 cm (3.9–10.2 in) tall, with three to eight leaves. The first one to three consist only of sheaths, which soon split; the remaining leaves form a rosette and have blades usually 7–10 cm (2.8–3.9 in) long by 1.2–2.6 cm (0.47–1.02 in) wide (although lengths and widths outside this range are also found). The blades have a short base somewhat resembling a stem. A small ligule is present at the junction of the blade and sheath.

Flowers appear in June to July in the wild. The stem (peduncle) of the flower spike (inflorescence) is held within the leaves. The flowers are white. The pale green bracts which subtend the flowers are more or less the same length as the calyx.

Each flower has the typical structure for Roscoea (see the diagrams in that article). There is a tube-shaped outer calyx, with a bluntly two-lobed apex. Next the three petals (the corolla) form a tube, 6–9 cm (2.4–3.5 in) long, which protrudes from the calyx and terminates in three lobes, a hooded upright central lobe, about 2.2–3 cm (0.87–1.18 in) long by 1 cm (0.39 in) wide, and two narrower side lobes, about 2–2.5 cm (0.79–0.98 in) long by about 5 mm (0.2 in) wide. Inside the petals are structures formed from four sterile stamens (staminodes): two lateral staminodes form what appear to be small upright petals, which are nearly circular, being 1.5–2.3 cm (0.6–0.9 in) by 1.2–1.5 cm (0.5–0.6 in), with a more or less central vein; two central staminodes are partially fused at the base to form a broad lip or labellum, 3.5–4 cm (1.4–1.6 in) long by about 2.5–4 cm (1.0–1.6 in) wide. The labellum is not bent backwards and is split into two lobes at the end.

The single functional stamen has a cream anther, about 8 mm (0.3 in) long, with very short spurs, 1–2 mm (0.0–0.1 in) long, formed from the connective tissue between the two capsules of the anther. The stigma is dome-shaped.

R. nepalensis does not closely resemble any other species. The small size of the spurs below the anthers are like those of R. alpina. The leaves have similarities to R. debilis in that the blades form rosettes and have narrow stem-like bases. The lateral staminodes of R. nepalensis are unusual in being more or less circular. The species is also unusual in only being known with white flowers.

== Taxonomy ==
Roscoea nepalensis was first collected in 1952 and was initially confused with R. alpina. It was first described as a new species by Elizabeth Jill Cowley, a botanist at the Royal Botanic Gardens, Kew, in 1980. The specific epithet nepalensis refers to the plant's occurrence in Nepal.

== Evolution and phylogeny ==
The family Zingiberaceae is mainly tropical in distribution. The unusual mountainous distribution of Roscoea may have evolved relatively recently as a response to the uplift taking place in the region in the last 50 million years or so due to the collision of the Indian and Asian tectonic plates.

Species of Roscoea divide into two clear groups, a Himalayan clade and a "Chinese" clade (which includes some species from outside China). The two clades correspond to a geographical separation, their main distributions being divided by the Brahmaputra River as it flows south at the end of the Himalayan mountain chain. It has been suggested that the genus may have originated in this area and then spread westwards along the Himalayas and eastwards into the mountains of China and its southern neighbours. R. nepalensis was not included in the phylogenetic analysis by Ngamriabsakul et al.; it falls into the geographical distribution of the Himalayan clade.

== Distribution and habitat ==
Roscoea nepalensis occurs in Nepal, growing at altitudes of around 2,400–3,100 m (7,900–10,200 ft) in grassland, among rocks and in open woodland in the shade of trees and shrubs.
