= Roscoea ngainoi =

Scientific classification
- Kingdom: Plantae
- Clade: Tracheophytes
- Clade: Angiosperms
- Clade: Monocots
- Clade: Commelinids
- Order: Zingiberales
- Family: Zingiberaceae
- Genus: Roscoea
- Species: R. ngainoi

Binomial name
- Roscoea ngainoi A.A.Mao & Bhaumik
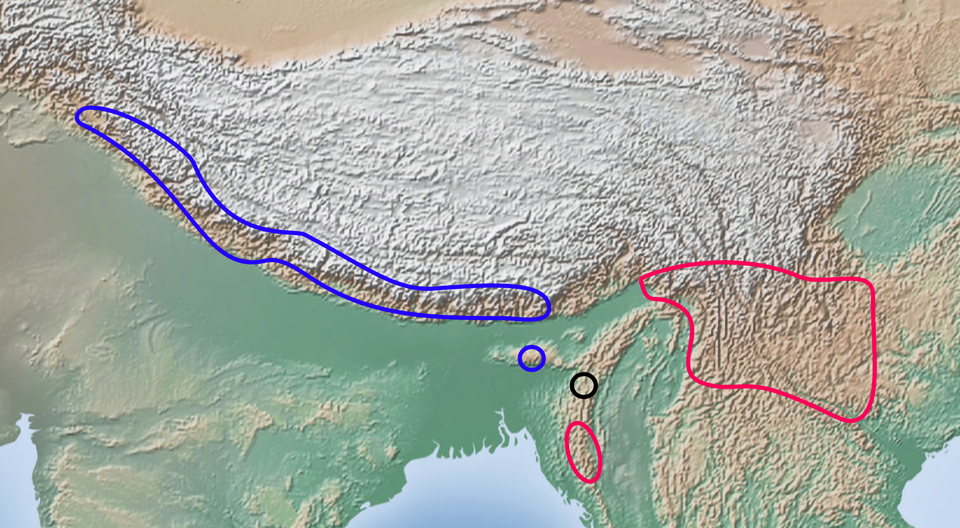
- Black circle shows distribution of Roscoea ngainoi

Species of flowering plant

Roscoea ngainoi is a perennial herbaceous plant occurring in the Ukhrul district of Manipur state, India. Most members of the ginger family (Zingiberaceae), to which it belongs, are tropical, but like other species of Roscoea, R. ngainoi grows in much colder mountainous regions.

== Description ==
Like all members of the genus Roscoea, R. ngainoi grows from a short vertical rhizome, to which are attached the tuberous roots. These produce "pseudostems": structures which resemble stems but are actually formed from the tightly wrapped bases (sheaths) of leaves. Plants are around 14 cm (5.5 in) tall when in flower with up to six leaves. The first two or three consist only of sheaths; the remaining leaves have a blade 2.3–18.5 cm (0.91–7.28 in) long by 1.6–3.5 cm (0.63–1.38 in) wide. At the junction of the sheath and blade there is a small ligule, extending to 1.5–2 mm (0.059–0.079 in).

The flower spike (inflorescence) is held within the leaves with generally one flower emerging at a time on a long corolla tube of up to 9.5 cm (3.7 in). The general flower colour is deep purple. The bracts which subtend the flowers are shorter than the calyx.

Each flower has the typical structure for Roscoea (see the diagrams in that article). There is a tube-shaped outer calyx, about 6 cm (2.4 in) long, with a three-lobed apex. Next the three petals (the corolla) form a tube, longer than the calyx, terminating in three lobes, an upright central lobe, about 2.6–3.0 cm (1.0–1.2 in) long by 1.0–1.2 cm (0.39–0.47 in) wide, and two somewhat narrower side lobes, 2.2–2.5 cm (0.87–0.98 in) long by 0.5–0.7 cm (0.20–0.28 in) wide. Inside the petals are structures formed from four sterile stamens (staminodes): two lateral staminodes form what appear to be small upright petals, which are 1.5–2.0 cm (0.59–0.79 in) by 0.6–0.8 cm (0.24–0.31 in), with a short narrowed part (a "claw") at the base; two central staminodes are partially fused at the base to form a lip or labellum, 2.0–2.3 cm (0.79–0.91 in) long by 1.2–1.6 cm (0.47–0.63 in) wide. The labellum divides to form two separated lobes, each 2.2–2.4 cm (0.87–0.94 in) long at the central edge, shorter at the outer edge. Two or three white lines extend from the base of each lobe, sometimes more than halfway to its finely toothed (serrulate) apex. The single functional stamen has a white anther, about 5–6 mm (0.20–0.24 in) long, with 2–13 mm (0.079–0.512 in) long spurs, formed from the connective tissue between the two capsules of the anther.

The species resembles R. tibetica, but the leaf blades are smaller, the corolla tubes much longer, exceeding the calyx, and the labellum is differently shaped and has white lines at the base. It was found on hills at elevations of 2,200–3,000 m (7,200–9,800 ft), in open grassy areas, where plants such as Lilium mackliniae were also present.

== Taxonomy ==
R. ngainoi was first described by A.A. Mao and M. Bhaumik in a paper published in 2008 (but dated 2007). The specific epithet ngainoi is derived from the Ngaino peak in Manipur, where the species was first found; the type specimen was collected in March 2005 at an altitude of 2,840 m (9,320 ft). R. ngainoi resembles R. tibetica and R. auriculata.

== Evolution and phylogeny ==
The family Zingiberaceae is mainly tropical in distribution. The unusual mountainous distribution of Roscoea may have evolved relatively recently and be a response to the uplift taking place in the region in the last 50 million years or so due to the collision of the Indian and Asian tectonic plates.

Species of Roscoea that have been subjected to molecular phylogenetic analysis divide into two clear groups, a Himalayan clade and a "Chinese" clade (which includes some species from outside China). R. nganoi was discovered after the analysis by Ngamriabsakul, Newman & Cronk (2000) so that as of August 2012 its phylogenetic position was unknown. Manipur, where it was found, lies between the main distributions of the two clades.
