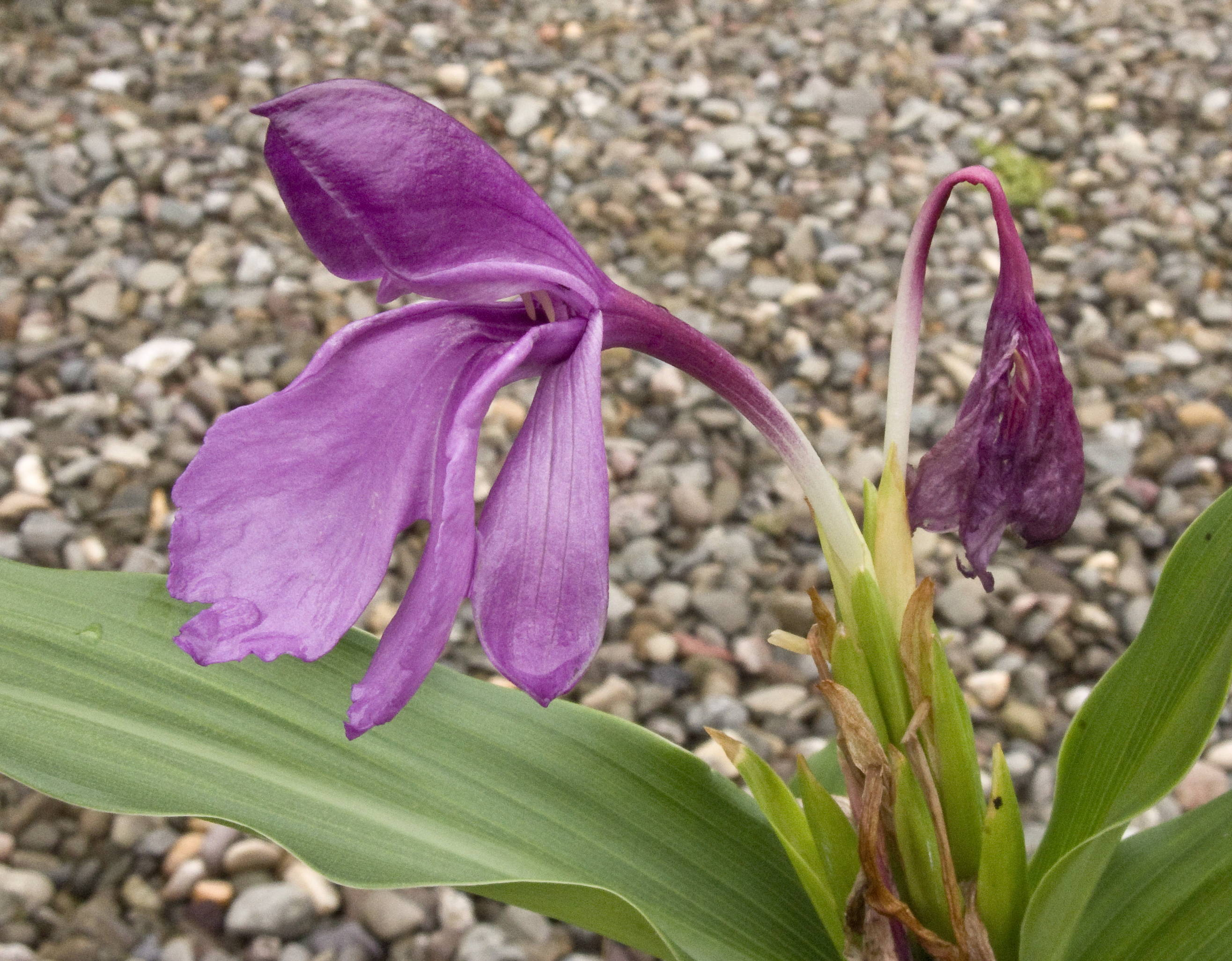

Scientific classification
- Kingdom: Plantae
- Clade: Tracheophytes
- Clade: Angiosperms
- Clade: Monocots
- Clade: Commelinids
- Order: Zingiberales
- Family: Zingiberaceae
- Genus: Roscoea
- Species: R. tumjensis

Binomial name
- Roscoea tumjensis Cowley

= Roscoea tumjensis =

Species of flowering plant

Roscoea tumjensis is a perennial herbaceous plant occurring in the Himalayas, in Nepal. Most members of the ginger family (Zingiberaceae), to which it belongs, are tropical, but R. tumjensis, like other species of Roscoea, grows in much colder mountainous regions.

== Description ==
Roscoea tumjensis is a perennial herbaceous plant. Like all members of the genus Roscoea, it dies back each year to a short vertical rhizome, to which are attached the tuberous roots. When growth begins again, "pseudostems" are produced: structures which resemble stems but are actually formed from the tightly wrapped bases (sheaths) of its leaves. In the case of R. tumjensis, the flowers appear before the leaves are fully grown. Plants are usually 18–25 cm tall, with four to six leaves. The first three to four consist only of sheaths, which may be marked with purple; the remaining leaves have a blade 4–8 cm by 1.5–4 cm, forming 'ears' (auriculate) at the junction of the blade and sheath. At the junction of the sheath and blade there is also small ligule, extending to 1–2 mm.

The flower spike (inflorescence) is held within the leaves. The flowers may be of various colours from pale lilac through to bright purple. The bracts which subtend the flowers are much shorter than the calyx.

Each flower has the typical structure for Roscoea (see the diagrams in that article). There is a tube-shaped outer calyx, with a three-lobed apex. Next the three petals (the corolla) form a tube, longer than the calyx, terminating in three lobes, an upright central lobe, about 3 cm long by 1.5–2.5 cm wide, and two narrower side lobes, about 3 cm long by about 0.9–1.4 cm wide. Inside the petals are structures formed from four sterile stamens (staminodes): two lateral staminodes form what appear to be small upright petals, which are 1.1–2.2 cm by 0.8–1.3 cm, with a central vein; two central staminodes are partially fused at the base to form a large lip or labellum, 4.5–5.5 cm long by about 3.5–4.5 cm wide. The labellum is split into two lobes at the end for about a quarter of its length.

The single functional stamen has a cream anther, about 6–8 mm long, with 6 mm long spurs formed from the connective tissue between the two capsules of the anther.

The flowers somewhat resemble those of R. humeana. The leaf blades have auriculate (ear-shaped) bases like those of R.auriculata, but the latter has white lateral staminodes with a vein which is not central, whereas R. tumjensis has flowers all of the same colour and lateral staminodes with a central vein.

== Taxonomy ==
Roscoea tumjensis was first described scientifically by Elizabeth Jill Cowley, a botanist at the Royal Botanic Gardens, Kew, in 1982. The specific epithet relates to location of the type specimen, which was collected by Gardner near Tumje in Nepal in June 1953.

The specimens collected by Gardner were originally labelled as R. purpurea var. auriculata (now R. auriculata) and R. chamaeleon (now R. cautleyoides), until Cowley created the new species.

== Evolution and phylogeny ==
The family Zingiberaceae is mainly tropical in distribution. The unusual mountainous distribution of Roscoea may have evolved relatively recently and be a response to the uplift taking place in the region in the last 50 million years or so due to the collision of the Indian and Asian tectonic plates.

Species of Roscoea divide into two clear groups, a Himalayan clade and a "Chinese" clade (which includes some species from outside China). The two clades correspond to a geographical separation, their main distributions being divided by the Brahmaputra River as it flows south at the end of the Himalayan mountain chain. It has been suggested that the genus may have originated in this area and then spread westwards along the Himalayas and eastwards into the mountains of China and its southern neighbours. R. tumjensis falls into the Himalayan clade as would be expected from its distribution.

== Distribution and habitat ==
Roscoea tumjensis occurs in the Himalayas, in central and eastern Nepal. The type specimen was collected at an altitude of 2,740 m.

== Cultivation ==
R. tumjensis is in cultivation in the UK, frequently incorrectly labelled R. brandisii.
