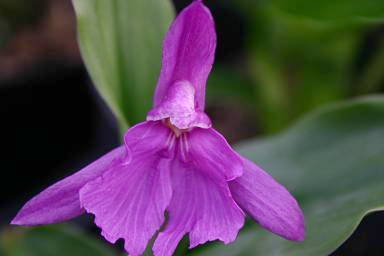

Scientific classification
- Kingdom: Plantae
- Clade: Tracheophytes
- Clade: Angiosperms
- Clade: Monocots
- Clade: Commelinids
- Order: Zingiberales
- Family: Zingiberaceae
- Genus: Roscoea
- Species: R. forrestii

Binomial name
- Roscoea forrestii Cowley

= Roscoea forrestii =

Species of flowering plant

Roscoea forrestii is a perennial herbaceous plant occurring in the Sichuan and Yunnan provinces of China. Most members of the ginger family (Zingiberaceae), to which it belongs, are tropical, but R. forrestii, like other species of Roscoea, grows in much colder mountainous regions. It is sometimes grown as an ornamental plant in gardens. It was named after George Forrest (1873–1932) who discovered it in Yunnan.

== Description ==
Roscoea forrestii is a perennial herbaceous plant. Like all members of the genus Roscoea, it dies back each year to a short vertical rhizome, to which are attached the tuberous roots. When growth begins again, "pseudostems" are produced: structures which resemble stems but are actually formed from the tightly wrapped bases (sheaths) of its leaves. Plants of R. forrestii are usually 17–30 cm tall, but may be up to 35 cm, with four to eight leaves. The first three to five leaves consist only of sheaths, which are flushed or dotted with pink. The remainder of the leaves have a blade which is free from the pseudostem and is 6.5–13 cm by 2–5 cm, smooth, or less often with short hairs (pubescent).

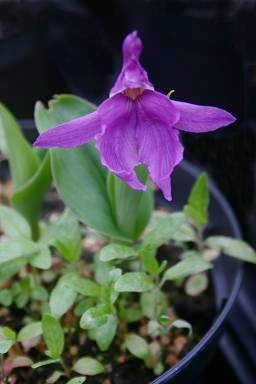
Plant in cultivation

In its native habitats, R. forrestii flowers between May and July. The stem (peduncle) of the flower spike is hidden by the leaf sheaths. The pale green bracts which subtend the flowers are shorter than the calyx or equal to it in length. Flowers may be purple or yellow.

Each flower has the typical structure for Roscoea (see the diagrams in that article). There is a tube-shaped outer calyx, flushed with pink, 5–13 cm long with a two- or three-toothed apex. Next the three petals (the corolla) form a tube which protrudes from the calyx, 5–13 cm long, terminating in three lobes, an upright central lobe, 2.5–4 cm long by 1.5–2.5 cm wide, with dark veins, and two narrower side lobes, 2.6–4 cm long by 5–10 mm wide. Inside the petals are structures formed from four sterile stamens (staminodes): two lateral staminodes form what appear to be small upright petals, 1.1–2.5 cm long; two central staminodes are fused at the base to form a lip or labellum, 3–4.1 cm long by 2.1–3 cm wide. The labellum bends backwards and is split from about halfway into two lobes.

The single functional stamen has a cream anther, about 5–8 cm long, with 5–9 mm long spurs formed from the connective tissue between the two capsules of the anther. The ovary is 1–5 cm long.

== Taxonomy ==
Roscoea forrestii was first described scientifically by Elizabeth Jill Cowley, a British botanist, in 1982. The specific epithet commemorates the Scottish plant collector George Forrest, who collected widely in western China and introduced many new garden plants to Europe and beyond. The type specimen was collected by Forrest in 1913 at 3,050 m in the Dali range in Yunnan.

== Evolution and phylogeny ==
The family Zingiberaceae is mainly tropical in distribution. The unusual mountainous distribution of Roscoea may have evolved relatively recently and be a response to the uplift taking place in the region in the last 50 million years or so due to the collision of the Indian and Asian tectonic plates.

Species of Roscoea divide into two clear groups, a Himalayan clade and a "Chinese" clade (which includes some species from outside China). The two clades correspond to a geographical separation, their main distributions being divided by the Brahmaputra River as it flows south at the end of the Himalayan mountain chain. It has been suggested that the genus may have originated in this area and then spread westwards along the Himalayas and eastwards into the mountains of China and its southern neighbours.

R. forrestii was not included in the analysis by Ngamriabsakul et al. It occurs in the geographical region of the Chinese clade, and is said to be close to R. humeana, which is a member of this clade.

== Distribution and habitat ==
Roscoea forrestii occurs in a variety of habitats, such as among shrubs and on cliffs, at between 2,000 and 3,400 metres. It is found in China, in south Sichuan and west Yunnan.

== Cultivation ==
Some Roscoea species and cultivars, including R. forrestii, are grown in rock gardens. They generally require a relatively sunny position with moisture-retaining but well-drained soil. As they do not appear above ground until late spring or even early summer, they escape frost damage in regions where subzero temperatures occur. R. forrestii was described in 1999 as "dwindling" when grown at the Royal Botanic Gardens, Kew, as it required more moisture.

R. forrestii was included in a trial of Roscoea held by the Royal Horticultural Society from 2009 to 2011. It proved hardy (rating H4, i.e. hardy anywhere in the British Isles). It grew successfully in the trial and was given the Award of Garden Merit. It still holds the award.

For propagation, see Roscoea: Cultivation.
