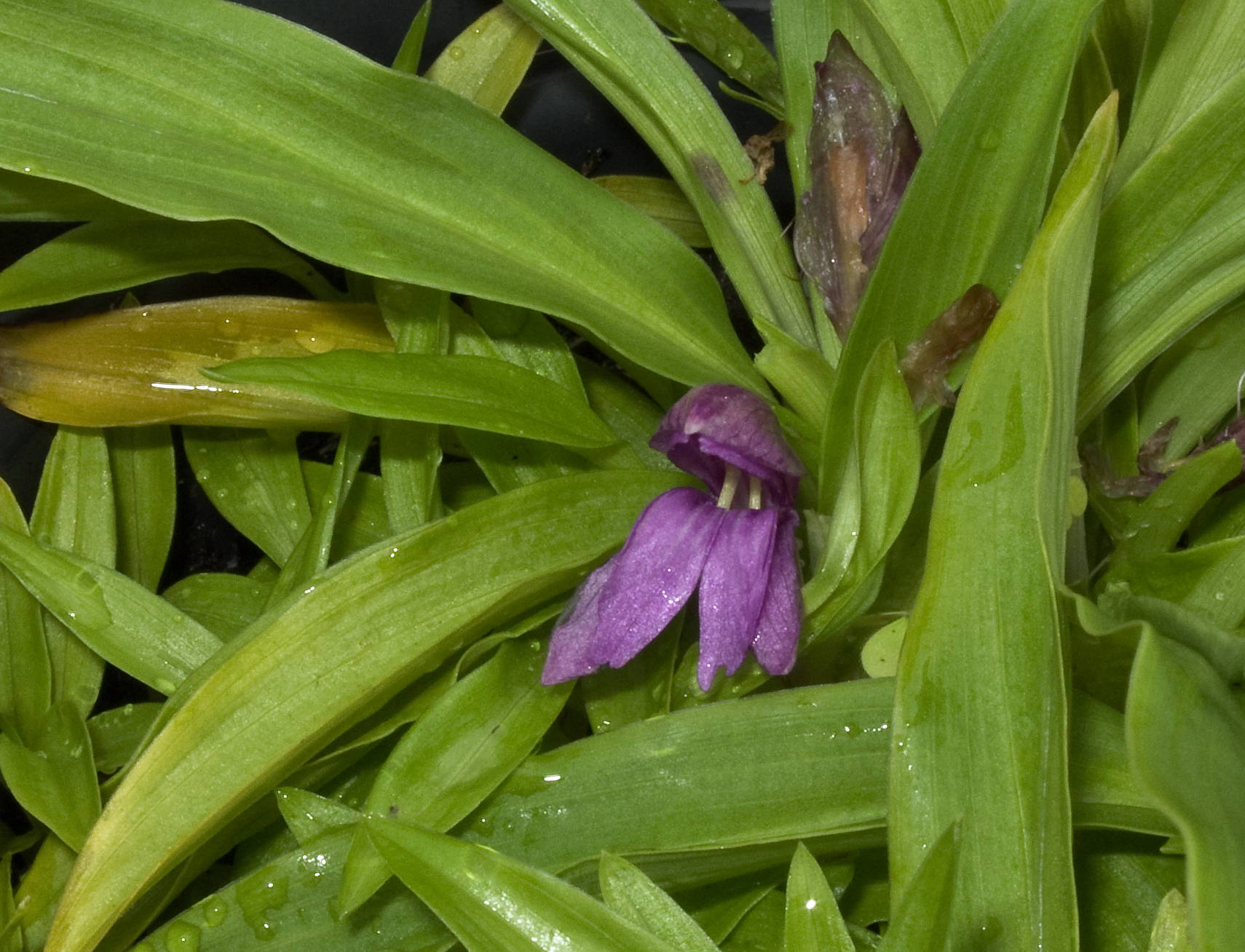
- R. kunmingensis var. kunmingensis in cultivation

Scientific classification
- Kingdom: Plantae
- Clade: Tracheophytes
- Clade: Angiosperms
- Clade: Monocots
- Clade: Commelinids
- Order: Zingiberales
- Family: Zingiberaceae
- Genus: Roscoea
- Species: R. kunmingensis

Binomial name
- Roscoea kunmingensis S.Q.Tong

= Roscoea kunmingensis =

Species of flowering plant

Roscoea kunmingensis is a perennial herbaceous plant native to the mountains of China, being found in Yunnan. Most members of the ginger family (Zingiberaceae), to which it belongs, are tropical, but R. kunmingensis, like other species of Roscoea, grows in much colder mountainous regions.

== Description ==
Roscoea kunmingensis is a perennial herbaceous plant. Like all members of the genus Roscoea, it dies back each year to a short vertical rhizome, to which are attached the tuberous roots. When growth begins again, "pseudostems" are produced: structures which resemble stems but are actually formed from the tightly wrapped bases (sheaths) of its leaves. R. kunmingensis is one of the smaller members of the genus; plants are 8–12 cm tall, with about four leaves consisting only of a sheath and further leaves with blades 8–20 cm long by 2.3–3 cm wide (rarely to 4.2 cm wide). The blade is smooth (glabrous). There is a small ligule, extending to about 3 mm, at the junction of the leaf sheath and blade.

In its native habitats, R. kunmingensis flowers between May and June. The stem (peduncle) of the flower spike (inflorescence) is hidden by the leaf sheaths. The spike has bracts, between 0.5 cm and 3.5 cm in length, which in some forms may enlarge to up to 8 cm after flowering. There are only one or two flowers per spike.

Each flower has the typical structure for Roscoea (see the diagrams in that article). There is a tube-shaped outer calyx. Next the three petals (the corolla) form a tube which is 3.5–4 cm and terminates in three lobes, an oblong upright central lobe, about 1.5–2 cm long by 6–8 mm wide, and two side lobes, narrower than the central lobe. Inside the petals are structures formed from four sterile stamens (staminodes): two lateral staminodes form what appear to be upright petals, about 1.4 cm long; two central staminodes are fused to form a lip or labellum, about 1.6–2.1 cm by 1–1.5 cm, which is deeply divided at the end into two lobes. The labellum has white lines at its base. The form in cultivation has purple flowers.

The single functional stamen has an anther about 4 mm long, with about 3 mm long spurs formed from the connective tissue between the two capsules of the anther. The cylinder-shaped ovary is about 3–3.5 cm long.

== Taxonomy ==
Roscoea kunmingensis was first described scientifically in 1992 by Tong Shao Quan, a Chinese botanist. The specific epithet refers to the locality of the plant, in the Kunming area of Yunnan. R. kunmingensis is closely related to R. praecox.

Two varieties have been distinguished.

- R. kunmingensis var. kunmingensis has narrower leaf blades (to 3 cm wide) and bracts between 0.5 and 0.7 cm long.
- R. kunmingensis var. elongatobractea has wider leaf blades (to 4.2 cm wide) and bracts between 2.5 and 3.5 cm long, lengthening after flowering to as much as 8 cm.

== Evolution and phylogeny ==
The family Zingiberaceae is mainly tropical in distribution. The unusual mountainous distribution of Roscoea may have evolved relatively recently and be a response to the uplift taking place in the region in the last 50 million years or so due to the collision of the Indian and Asian tectonic plates.

Species of Roscoea divide into two clear groups, a Himalayan clade and a "Chinese" clade (which includes some species from outside China). The two clades correspond to a geographical separation, their main distributions being divided by the Brahmaputra River as it flows south at the end of the Himalayan mountain chain. It has been suggested that the genus may have originated in this area and then spread westwards along the Himalayas and eastwards into the mountains of China and its southern neighbours.

R. kunmingensis was not included in the analysis by Ngamriabsakul et al. It occurs in the geographical region of the Chinese clade.

== Distribution and habitat ==
Roscoea kunmingensis is native to mountains in Yunnan, China, where it is found in forests, at heights of 2,100–2,200 m.

== Cultivation ==
Some Roscoea species and cultivars are grown in rock gardens. They generally require a relatively sunny position with moisture-retaining but well-drained soil. As they do not appear above ground until late spring or even early summer, they escape frost damage in regions where subzero temperatures occur. R. kunmingensis has been offered for sale in the United Kingdom and was described as thriving "in a fertile loam, outside, over many years, including our all-time low of −17 °C in the winter of 2010-2011."

For propagation, see Roscoea: Cultivation.
