= Roscoea schneideriana =

- In cultivation

Scientific classification
- Kingdom: Plantae
- Clade: Tracheophytes
- Clade: Angiosperms
- Clade: Monocots
- Clade: Commelinids
- Order: Zingiberales
- Family: Zingiberaceae
- Genus: Roscoea
- Species: R. schneideriana

Binomial name
- Roscoea schneideriana (Loes.) Cowley

Synonyms
- Roscoea yunnanensis var. schneideriana Loes.; Roscoea yunnanensis var. dielsiana Loes.; Roscoea brevibracteata Z.Y.Zhu

Species of flowering plant

Roscoea schneideriana is a species of flowering plant in the ginger family, Zingiberaceae. It is a perennial herbaceous plant found in China, in Tibet, Sichuan and Yunnan. Most members of the Zingiberaceae family, to which it belongs, are tropical, but R. schneideriana grows in much colder mountainous regions.

== Description ==
Roscoea schneideriana is a perennial herbaceous plant. Like all members of the genus Roscoea, it dies back each year to a short vertical rhizome, to which are attached the tuberous roots. When growth begins again, "pseudostems" are produced: structures which resemble stems but are actually formed from the tightly wrapped bases (sheaths) of its leaves. Plants are 9–45 cm (3.5–17.7 in) tall with usually four to six leaves, although there may be as few as two. The leaves form a rosette at the end of the pseudostem and have narrow blades usually 10–22 cm (3.9–8.7 in) long by 0.4–2 cm (0.16–0.79 in) wide, usually curved (falcate), hairless (glabrous), and with a pointed tip.

Flowers appear in July to August in the wild. The stem (peduncle) of the flower spike (inflorescence) is either held within the leaf sheaths or sometimes slightly extended from them. The flowers usually open one at a time and are purple or white. The ellipse-shaped bracts which subtend the flowers are 3.3–7 cm (1.3–2.8 in).

Detail of flower

Each flower has the typical structure for Roscoea (see the diagrams in that article). There is a tube-shaped outer calyx, 3–4 cm (1.2–1.6 in) long, with a two-toothed apex. Next the three petals (the corolla) form a tube 4–4.5 cm (1.6–1.8 in) long, terminating in three lobes, an elliptical upright central lobe, about 1.7–3.5 cm (0.67–1.38 in) long and two similarly sized but somewhat narrower side lobes. Inside the petals are structures formed from four sterile stamens (staminodes): two lateral staminodes form what appear to be small upright petals, which are about 1.5–2.5 cm (0.6–1.0 in) long; two central staminodes are fused to form a lip or labellum, 1.8–3.5 cm (0.7–1.4 in) long by about 1–2.5 cm (0.4–1.0 in) wide. The labellum does not bend downwards and is split into two lobes for about half its length.

The single functional stamen has a yellow anther, about 6–9 mm (0.2–0.4 in) long, with 8–9 mm (0.3–0.4 in) long spurs formed from the connective tissue between the two capsules of the anther. The stigma is funnel-shaped.

== Taxonomy ==
Roscoea schneideriana was first described by Ludwig Loesener in 1923 as R. yunnanensis var. schneideriana. (R. yunnanensis is now regarded as a synonym of R. cautleyoides.) Jill Cowley raised it to a full species in 1982.

== Evolution and phylogeny ==
The family Zingiberaceae is mainly tropical in distribution. The unusual mountainous distribution of Roscoea may have evolved relatively recently and be a response to the uplift taking place in the region in the last 50 million years or so due to the collision of the Indian and Asian tectonic plates.

Species of Roscoea divide into two clear groups, a Himalayan clade and a "Chinese" clade (which includes some species from outside China). The two clades correspond to a geographical separation, being divided by the Brahmaputra River as it flows south at the end of the Himalayan mountain chain. It has been suggested that the genus may have originated in this area and then spread westwards along the Himalayas and eastwards into the mountains of China and its southern neighbours. R. schneideriana is in the Chinese clade, as would be expected from its distribution.

== Distribution and habitat ==
Roscoea schneideriana is found in Tibet, Sichuan and Yunnan, in China, growing at altitudes of 2,600–3,500 m (8,500–11,500 ft) in mixed forests, moist stony grassland and rocky mountain cliffs.
