= R. nepalensis =

R. nepalensis may refer to:

- Rana nepalensis, a frog native to Asia
- Rodgersia nepalensis, a perennial plant
- Roscoea nepalensis, a perennial plant
- Roseomonas nepalensis, a Gram-negative bacterium
- Rubus nepalensis, an evergreen raspberry
- Rumex nepalensis, a perennial herb
- Russula nepalensis, a mycorrhizal mushroom
