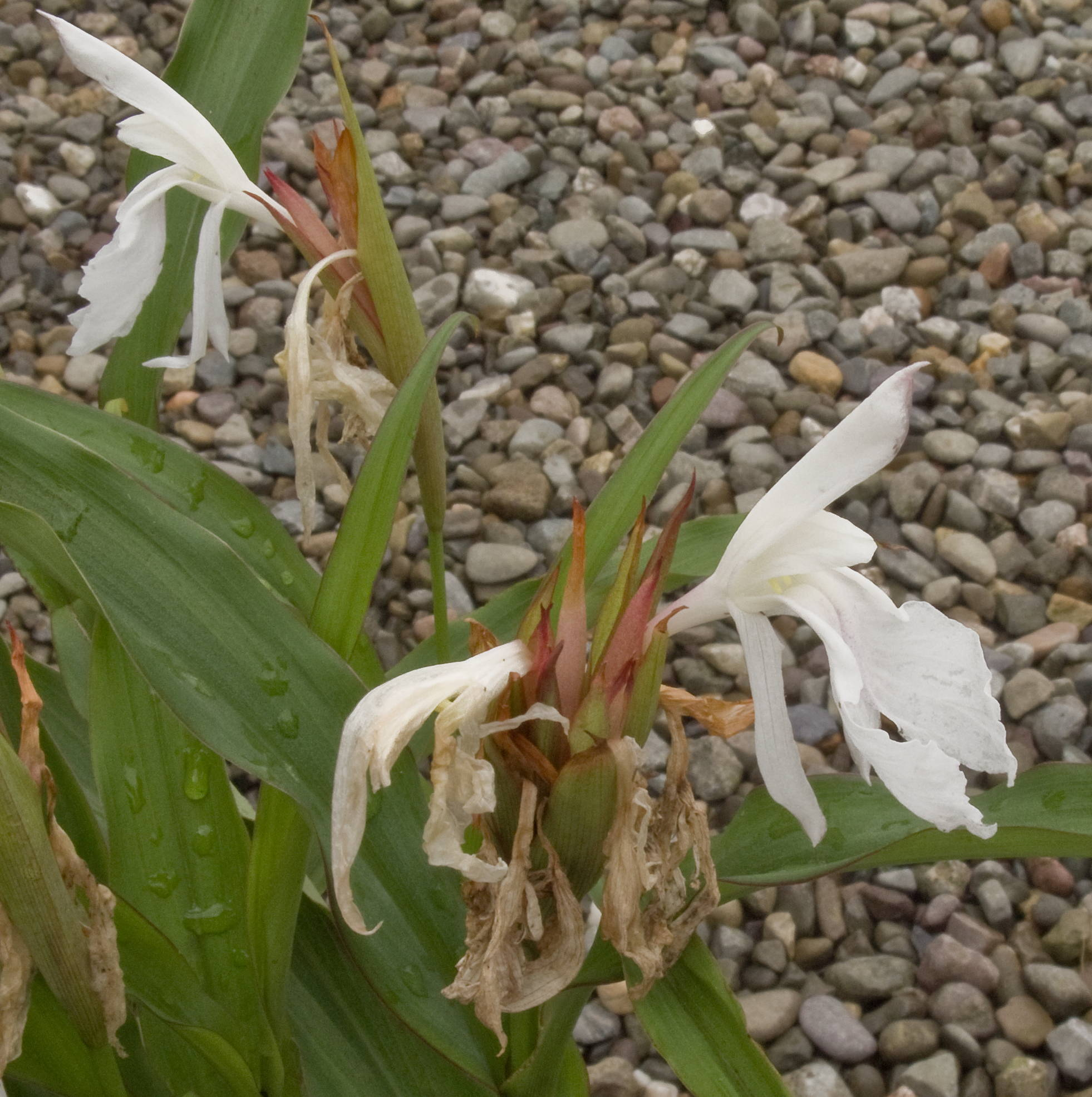
- Roscoea × beesiana 'Monique'

Scientific classification
- Kingdom: Plantae
- Clade: Tracheophytes
- Clade: Angiosperms
- Clade: Monocots
- Clade: Commelinids
- Order: Zingiberales
- Family: Zingiberaceae
- Genus: Roscoea
- Species: R. × beesiana

Binomial name
- Roscoea × beesiana Cowley & C.Whitehouse

= Roscoea × beesiana =

Species of flowering plant

Roscoea × beesiana is considered to be a hybrid between R. auriculata and R. cautleyoides which occurred in cultivation. The flowers are variable: most forms have a pale cream base colour with varying amounts of purple streaking, particularly on the lip or labellum from midsummer to early autumn. It was given the Award of Garden Merit by the Royal Horticultural Society in 2011. It is classified as being hardy throughout the British Isles.

== Description ==
Like all members of the genus Roscoea, it dies back each year to a short vertical rhizome, to which are attached the tuberous roots. When growth begins again, "pseudostems" are produced: structures which resemble stems but are actually formed from the tightly wrapped bases (sheaths) of its leaves. R. × beesiana is usually 48–60 cm tall, with seven to nine leaves, of which at most the lowest one consists only of a sheath. Each leaf has a small ligule, extending to about 1–2 mm. The blade of the leaf (the part free from the pseudostem) is usually 8–29 cm long (occasionally as little as 4 cm long) by 2.1–4.5 cm wide. There are small "ears" at the junction of the blade and sheath (i.e. the leaf is somewhat auriculate). The leaf sheath has reddish markings.

The flower spike, which has 9–17 flowers, emerges from the leaf sheaths on a stalk (peduncle) visible for up to 3 cm. The flowers are basically cream, with varying amounts of purple streaking and marking, particularly on the labellum, which may be almost entirely purple. Green bracts, flushed with red, surround the flowers, and are about the same length as the calyx.

Each flower has the typical structure for Roscoea (see that article for labelled images). There is a tube-shaped outer calyx, 5.0–5.4 cm long, pale red in colour, with a two-toothed apex. Next the three petals (the corolla) form a tube 5.0–5.4 cm long, terminating in three lobes: an upright hooded central lobe, 3.8–4.2 cm long by 1.6-2.0 cm wide, and two very slightly shorter and much narrower side lobes. Inside the petals are structures formed from four sterile stamens (staminodes): two lateral staminodes form what appear to be small upright petals, 1.8–2.0 cm long by 0.8–0.9 cm wide; two central staminodes are fused at the base to form a lip or labellum, 4.2–4.5 cm long and 3.2 cm wide. This is split at the end for about two thirds of its length into two lobes. The single functional stamen has a linear white anther with a pointed yellow spur formed from the connective tissue between the two capsules of the anther.

R. × beesiana differs from its putative parents in flower colour and in several other ways. It has a more deeply divided labellum than R. auriculata, whose labellum is either unlobed or lobed to less than half its length. Unlike R. cautleyoides, it has leaves with small "ears" at the junction of the blade and sheath and larger bracts, over rather than under 6 cm long.

== Origin and taxonomy ==
R. × beesiana is considered to be a hybrid between R. auriculata and R. cautleyoides, but its precise origin is unknown. The epithet beesiana is derived from a plant nursery in England called Bees Ltd, founded by Arthur K. Bulley, well known as a plant enthusiast in the late 19th and early 20th century. However, there is no evidence that the hybrid occurred there; the first mention of the name is in 1970, "long after the heyday" of the nursery. The name was not formally published until 2009, when Jill Cowley and Christopher Whitehouse provided a description and Latin diagnosis. It has also been known under the cultivar name Roscoea 'Beesiana', an invalid name under the International Code of Nomenclature for Cultivated Plants, which does not allow Latin words as cultivar names after 1958.

== Cultivation ==
Coming from monsoon areas, roscoeas are used to wet summers and dry winters. Moisture retentive but well-drained soils are recommended, with limited exposure to hot sun, although R. × beesiana has proved more tolerant than others in cultivation.

Cultivar Group names have been used to classify forms by the amount of purple on the labellum:

- Cream Group – few or no purple markings.
- Gestreept Group ("Striped Group") – distinct purple markings giving the effect of stripes.
- Dark Group – strong purple markings which are almost continuous on the labellum.

In addition, a form with a paler, almost white base colour and only a small amount of purple streaking has been given the cultivar name 'Monique'. R. × beesiana was included in a trial of Roscoea held by the Royal Horticultural Society from 2009 to 2011. It proved hardy (rating H4 on the scale then in use, i.e. hardy anywhere in the British Isles). All the cultivars performed well and the hybrid was given the Award of Garden Merit.

For propagation, see Roscoea: Cultivation.

Variation in markings

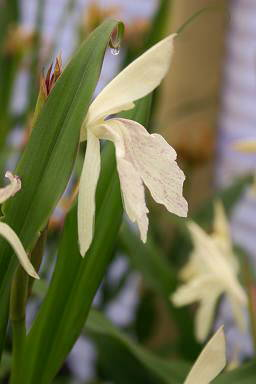
Cream Group

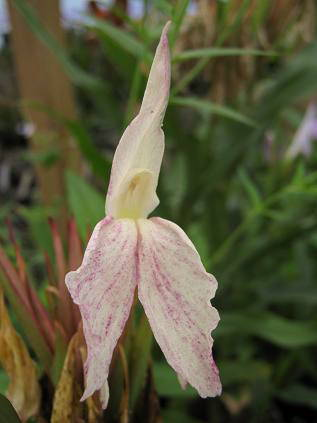
Gestreept Group

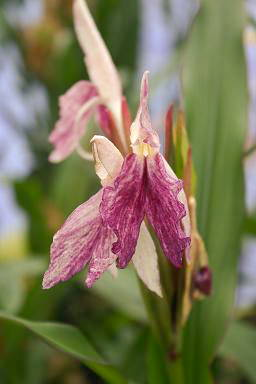
Dark Group
