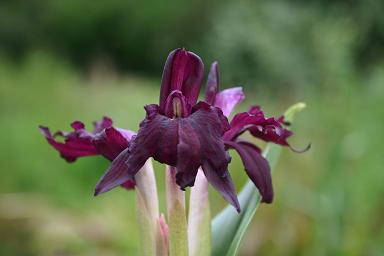
- In cultivation

Scientific classification
- Kingdom: Plantae
- Clade: Tracheophytes
- Clade: Angiosperms
- Clade: Monocots
- Clade: Commelinids
- Order: Zingiberales
- Family: Zingiberaceae
- Genus: Roscoea
- Species: R. wardii

Binomial name
- Roscoea wardii Cowley

= Roscoea wardii =

Species of flowering plant

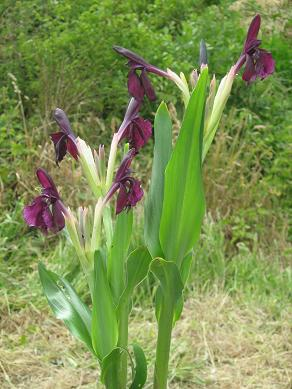
In cultivation

Roscoea wardii is a perennial herbaceous plant occurring from eastern Arunachal Pradesh in India to western Yunnan in China. Most members of the ginger family (Zingiberaceae), to which it belongs, are tropical, but like other species of Roscoea, R. wardii grows in much colder mountainous regions.

== Description ==
Roscoea wardii is a perennial herbaceous plant. Like all members of the genus Roscoea, it grows from a short rhizome, to which the tuberous roots are attached. When growth begins again, "pseudostems" are produced: structures which resemble stems but are actually formed from the tightly wrapped bases (sheaths) of its leaves. R. wardii reaches a height of 32 cm. There are three to five bladeless sheathing leaves with pink veins and two to three full leaves, 7–8 cm long by 1.7–4.5 cm wide. At the junction of the blade and sheath there are small transparent structures (ligules), 1–2 mm high.

The stem (peduncle) of the flower spike is short, almost absent in some plants. The flowers are typically deep purple in colour, although paler rose-coloured forms are known. Pale green bracts, 3.5–5.5 cm long, surround the base of the flowers.

Each flower has the typical structure for Roscoea (see that article for labelled images). There is a tube-shaped outer calyx, about 3.3–4.5 cm long, which emerges from the surrounding bracts. Next the three petals (the corolla) form a long tube about 4–8 cm long, usually emerging from the calyx, at least when the flowers are mature. The tube terminates in three petal lobes: an upright central lobe and two slightly shorter side lobes. The central lobe is about 2–3.2 cm long by 1.3–2.5 cm wide; the side lobes are considerably smaller, 0.2–0.3 cm long by 0.4–1.4 cm wide. Inside the petals are structures formed from four sterile stamens (staminodes). Two lateral staminodes form what appear to be small petals, about 1.6–2 cm long by 0.7–1 cm wide, including a short narrowed "claw" at the base. Two central staminodes are fused at the base to form a lip or labellum, about 2.2–4.5 cm long by 1.6–4.5 cm wide. The labellum is deeply lobed and has three white lines at the base of each lobe.

The single functional stamen has a white anther, about 6–9 mm long, and the typical Roscoea "spurs" on the filament – blunt-tipped in the case of R. wardii. The three-celled ovary is about 3 cm long when matured with seeds.

== Taxonomy ==
R. wardii was first described by Jill Cowley in 1982.

== Evolution and phylogeny ==
The family Zingiberaceae is mainly tropical in distribution. The unusual mountainous distribution of Roscoea may have evolved relatively recently and be a response to the uplift taking place in the region in the last 50 million years or so due to the collision of the Indian and Asian tectonic plates.

Species of Roscoea divide into two clear groups, a Himalayan clade and a "Chinese" clade (which includes some species from outside China). The two clades correspond to a geographical separation, their main distributions being divided by the Brahmaputra River as it flows south at the end of the Himalayan mountain chain. It has been suggested that the genus may have originated in this area and then spread westwards along the Himalayas and eastwards into the mountains of China and its southern neighbours. R. wardii falls into the Chinese clade as would be expected from its distribution. It is closely related to R. cautleyoides, R. humeana and R. praecox.

== Distribution and habitat ==
Roscoea wardii is found in mountainous regions along the borders between Tibet, Yunnan (China), Arunachal Pradesh (India) (Note: Cowley (2007, p. 91) (along with other sources) describes the range as including "Assam". When specimens were first collected by Kingdon Ward in 1926–33, the region in which he found them was part of the Assam Province of British India, but has since become part of the Indian state of Arunachal Pradesh. The border between Arunachal Pradesh and Chinese-controlled Tibet is disputed.) and Burma.

== Cultivation ==
R. wardii was included in a trial of Roscoea held by the Royal Horticultural Society from 2009 to 2011. It proved hardy with a rating of H4 (hardy though most of the UK apart from inland valleys, at winter altitude and central/northerly locations). It was given the Award of Garden Merit, subject to availability, and currently holds the award.

== Bibliography ==
- Cowley, Jill (2007), The genus Roscoea, Royal Botanic Gardens, Kew, ISBN 978-1-84246-134-1
