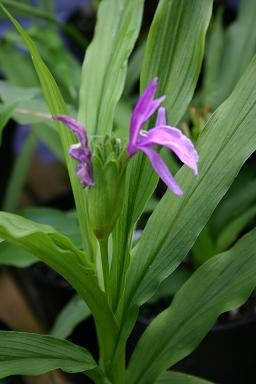

Scientific classification
- Kingdom: Plantae
- Clade: Tracheophytes
- Clade: Angiosperms
- Clade: Monocots
- Clade: Commelinids
- Order: Zingiberales
- Family: Zingiberaceae
- Genus: Roscoea
- Species: R. capitata

Binomial name
- Roscoea capitata Sm.

= Roscoea capitata =

Species of flowering plant

Roscoea capitata is a perennial herbaceous plant native to the Himalayas, being found in Nepal. Most members of the ginger family (Zingiberaceae), to which it belongs, are tropical, but R. capitata, like other species of Roscoea, grows in much colder mountainous regions.

== Description ==
Roscoea capitata is a perennial herbaceous plant. Like all members of the genus Roscoea, it dies back each year to a short vertical rhizome, to which are attached the tuberous roots. When growth begins again, "pseudostems" are produced: structures which resemble stems but are actually formed from the tightly wrapped bases (sheaths) of its leaves. R. capitata grows to 30–50 cm tall. The leaf blades are relatively long and narrow, 15–25 cm long by 1–3 cm wide, with a marked "keel" (i.e. they are folded along a central rib).

In its native habitats, R. capitata flowers between July and August. The flower spike has green bracts some 4–4.5 cm long by 1 cm wide which form a distinctive dense green "head", on a stem (peduncle) 5–10 cm in length. Flowers then appear in succession from between the bracts. In the Flora of China, they are described as "blue"; elsewhere they are described as pink to purple.

Each flower has the typical structure for Roscoea (see the diagrams in that article). There is a tube-shaped outer calyx, some 2.5 cm long, which is hairy (pubescent), particularly along the veins, and is split on one side with two teeth at the end. Next the three petals (the corolla) form a tube which is shorter than the calyx and terminates in three lobes, a more-or-less oblong upright central lobe, about 2 cm long, which is hooded, and two side lobes, longer than the central lobe. Inside the petals are structures formed from four sterile stamens (staminodes): two lateral staminodes form what appear to be petals, about 2 cm long; two central staminodes are fused to form a lip or labellum, about 2.5 cm by 1.4 cm, which is divided at the end into two lobes.

The single functional stamen has an anther about 5 mm long, with about 1 cm long spurs formed from the connective tissue between the two capsules of the anther. The ovary is pink and forms a capsule about 2.5 cm long after flowering when seeds are formed.

== Taxonomy ==
Roscoea capitata was first described scientifically in 1822 by the English botanist James Edward Smith, who had previously created the genus Roscoea in 1806. It was described from specimens collected by the Danish botanist Nathaniel Wallich. The specific epithet "capitata" has the meaning "forming a dense head", here referring to the way the flowers are borne.

In 1901, François Gagnepain described two plants as varieties of this species: R. capitata var. purpurata and R. capitata var. scillifolia. Both are now considered to be separate species, R. cautleyoides and R. scillifolia respectively.

== Evolution and phylogeny ==
The family Zingiberaceae is mainly tropical in distribution. The unusual mountainous distribution of Roscoea may have evolved relatively recently and be a response to the uplift taking place in the region in the last 50 million years or so due to the collision of the Indian and Asian tectonic plates.

Species of Roscoea divide into two clear groups, a Himalayan clade and a "Chinese" clade (which includes some species from outside China). The two clades correspond to a geographical separation, their main distributions being divided by the Brahmaputra River as it flows south at the end of the Himalayan mountain chain. It has been suggested that the genus may have originated in this area and then spread westwards along the Himalayas and eastwards into the mountains of China and its southern neighbours. R. capitata is part of the Himalayan clade, as would be expected from its distribution. It is most closely related to R. ganeshensis.

== Distribution and habitat ==
Roscoea capitata is native to the eastern Himalayas and in particular central Nepal, where it is said to grow on grassy or stony hillsides and slopes, often on disturbed ground. The Flora of China also gives its distribution as "Xizang" (i.e. Tibet), although this is not supported by other sources.

== Bibliography ==
- Cowley, Jill & Wilford, Richard (2002), "350. Roscoea capitata. Zingiberaceae.", Curtis's Botanical Magazine, 15: 226–230, doi:10.1111/j.1467-8748.2002.tb00582.x
