= Roscoea megalantha =

Scientific classification
- Kingdom: Plantae
- Clade: Tracheophytes
- Clade: Angiosperms
- Clade: Monocots
- Clade: Commelinids
- Order: Zingiberales
- Family: Zingiberaceae
- Genus: Roscoea
- Species: R. megalantha

Binomial name
- Roscoea megalantha Tosh.Yoshida & Yangzom

Synonyms
- Roscoea purpurea f. alba Cowley

Indian plant in ginger family

Roscoea megalantha is a species of flowering plant in the ginger family Zingiberaceae, native to Bhutan and India. It was formerly included within Roscoea purpurea, but it was described as a separate species in 2017.

== Taxonomy ==
Roscoea megalantha was first described as a separate species in 2017. Previously it had been treated as merely a white form (f. alba) of Roscoea purpurea. The plant was given its scientific name for its large flowers.

== Distribution ==
Roscoea megalantha occurs in the eastern parts of Bhutan and Arunachal Pradesh in India from 1800 to 3500 m above sea level.
