= Roscoea brandisii =

Scientific classification
- Kingdom: Plantae
- Clade: Tracheophytes
- Clade: Angiosperms
- Clade: Monocots
- Clade: Commelinids
- Order: Zingiberales
- Family: Zingiberaceae
- Genus: Roscoea
- Species: R. brandisii

Binomial name
- Roscoea brandisii (King ex Baker) K.Schum.

Species of plant

Roscoea brandisii is a species of herbaceous flowering plant in the Zingiberaceae family. It is a perennial found in the state of Meghalaya, India. Most members of the ginger family, to which it belongs, are tropical, but R. brandisii, like other species of Roscoea, grows in much colder mountainous regions.

== Description ==
Roscoea brandisii is a perennial herbaceous plant. Like all members of the genus Roscoea, it dies back each year to a short vertical rhizome, to which are attached the tuberous roots. When growth begins again, "pseudostems" are produced: structures which resemble stems but are actually formed from the tightly wrapped bases (sheaths) of its leaves. Plants are usually 25–35 cm (9.8–13.8 in) tall, occasionally shorter or up to 45 cm (18 in). The first one or two leaves consist only of sheaths; the remaining 5–8(–11) leaves have curved (falcate) blades mainly 8–12 cm (3.1–4.7 in) long by 1–2 cm (0.39–0.79 in) wide (although lengths and widths outside this range are also found). The sheaths sometimes have small 'ears' (auriculate) at the junction of the blade and sheath, where there is also a small ligule, extending to about 1 mm (0.0 in).

The stem (peduncle) of the flower spike (inflorescence) is held within the leaves. The bracts which subtend the flowers are more or less the same length as the calyx.

Each flower has the typical structure for Roscoea (see the diagrams in that article). There is a tube-shaped outer calyx, with a bluntly two-lobed apex. Next the three petals (the corolla) form a white tube, longer than the calyx, terminating in three purple lobes, a hooded upright central lobe, about 2.3–2.8 cm (0.91–1.10 in) long by 1.3 cm (0.51 in) wide, and two narrower side lobes, about 2.3 cm (0.91 in) long by about 4 mm (0.2 in) wide (which are sometimes fused). Inside the petals are structures formed from four sterile stamens (staminodes): two lateral staminodes form what appear to be small upright petals, which are 1.3–1.5 cm (0.5–0.6 in) by 5–6 mm (0.2–0.2 in), with a non-central vein; two central staminodes are fused to form a lip or labellum, 2.5–2.8 cm (1.0–1.1 in) long by about 1.0–1.4 cm (0.4–0.6 in) wide. The labellum may or may not be split into two lobes at the end.

The single functional stamen has an anther, about 6.0–6.5 mm (0.2–0.3 in) long, with 7–8 mm (0.3–0.3 in) long spurs formed from the connective tissue between the two capsules of the anther. The seeds when they form are brown and somewhat elliptical.

R. brandisii resembles R. auriculata. The two species are separated by lowlands in Assam and the Indian state of West Bengal. R. brandisii is usually smaller, with narrower falcate leaves and smaller purple flowers with a long white tube at the base.

== Taxonomy ==
Roscoea brandisii was initially treated as part of R. purpurea (e.g. by Hooker in 1852). It was first separately named in 1890 as Roscoea purpurea var. brandisii King ex Baker. Karl Schumann elevated it to a full species in 1904. The collector of the type specimen was named Brandis.

== Evolution and phylogeny ==
The family Zingiberaceae is mainly tropical in distribution. The unusual mountainous distribution of Roscoea may have evolved relatively recently as a reaction to the uplift taking place in the region in the last 50 million years or so due to the collision of the Indian and Asian tectonic plates.

Species of Roscoea divide into two clear groups, a Himalayan clade and a "Chinese" clade (which includes some species from outside China). The two clades correspond to a geographical separation, their main distributions being divided by the Brahmaputra River as it flows south at the end of the Himalayan mountain chain. It has been suggested that the genus may have originated in this area and then spread westwards along the Himalayas and eastwards into the mountains of China and its southern neighbours. R. brandisii falls into the Himalayan clade. It occurs to the south of the rest of the clade, on the other side of the Brahmaputra River.

== Distribution and habitat ==
Roscoea brandisii occurs only in the Khasia Hills in the modern Indian state of Meghalaya (formerly part of the state of Assam). It grows at altitudes of 1,520–3,050 m (4,990–10,010 ft) in grassland, rocky areas and banks, and on cliffs.

== Cultivation ==
As of August 2012, R. brandisii is not known to be in cultivation. R. tumjensis has been grown in the UK under this name.
