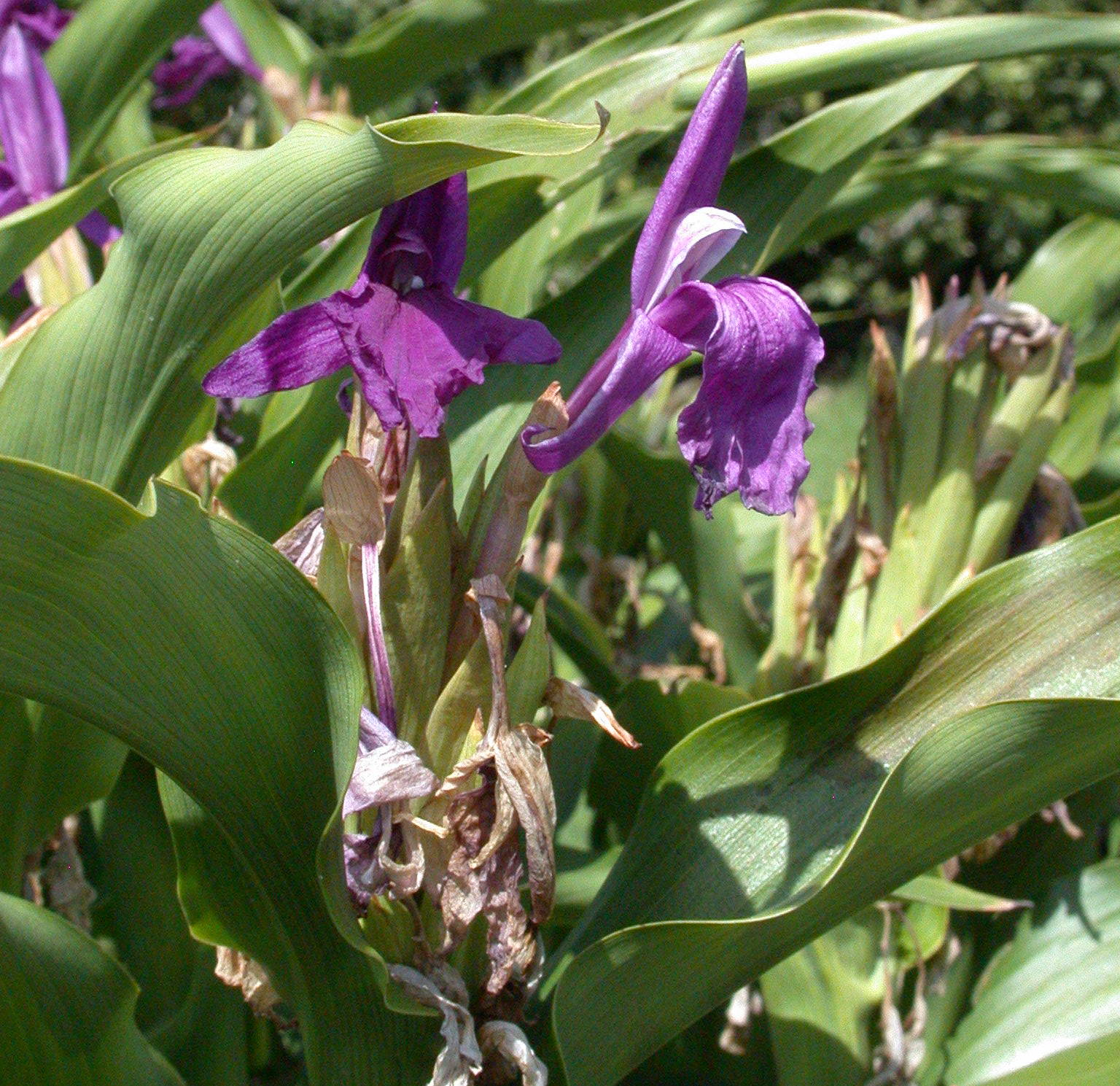
- R. auriculata

Scientific classification
- Kingdom: Plantae
- Clade: Tracheophytes
- Clade: Angiosperms
- Clade: Monocots
- Clade: Commelinids
- Order: Zingiberales
- Family: Zingiberaceae
- Genus: Roscoea; Sm.

Species
- See text.

= Roscoea =

Genus of flowering plants

Roscoea is a genus of perennial plants of the family Zingiberaceae (the ginger family). While most members of the ginger family are tropical, Roscoea species are native to cooler mountainous regions of the Himalayas, China and its southern neighbours. Roscoea flowers superficially resemble orchids, although they are not related. The flowers of Roscoea have a complicated structure, in which some of the showy coloured parts are not formed by petals, but by staminodes, sterile stamens which have evolved to resemble petals. Some species are grown as ornamental plants in gardens.

== Description ==
Roscoea is found from Kashmir through the Himalayas to Vietnam, extending northwards into China. There are up to 22 recognized species, of which 8 are endemic to China. Typically they grow in grassland, in screes or on the edges of deciduous woodland at heights of 1,200–5,000 metres (3,900–16,400 ft), coming into growth at the start of the monsoon season.

Species of Roscoea are small perennial herbaceous plants. They die back each year to a short vertical rhizome, to which the tuberous roots are attached. Like many members of the Zingiberales (the order to which the gingers belong), Roscoea has pseudostems; structures which resemble stems but are actually formed from the tightly wrapped bases of its leaves ("sheaths"). The leaves are without a stalk (petiole). Lower leaves may consist solely of a sheath; upper leaves have a blade which is free from the pseudostem, and is oblong or lanceolate (i.e. considerably longer than it is wide). The relative number of bladeless versus complete leaves is one distinguishing feature of the two clades into which the genus is divided.

The flowers are borne in a spike at the end of the pseudostems. The stalk (peduncle) bearing the flowers may be long, so that the flowers appear well above the leaves, or short, so that they appear between the upper leaf sheaths. Like other members of the ginger family (Zingiberaceae), Roscoea flowers have a complex structure (superficially resembling that of an orchid, although they are not related). Each flower has a tube-shaped outer calyx, which is split on one side and ends in two or three teeth. The petals are joined together at the base, and then divide into three lobes. The central lobe is upright and usually forms a hood; the two side lobes are narrower than the central one. The flower then has what appear to be three inner petals, which are actually formed from four sterile stamens (staminodes). Two lateral staminodes form what look like upright petals, often also hooded in shape; two other staminodes are fused together to form a prominent central "lip" or labellum. (Note: Some sources use the term "staminode" only for the lateral staminodes. See e.g. Wilford (2012, p. 79).)

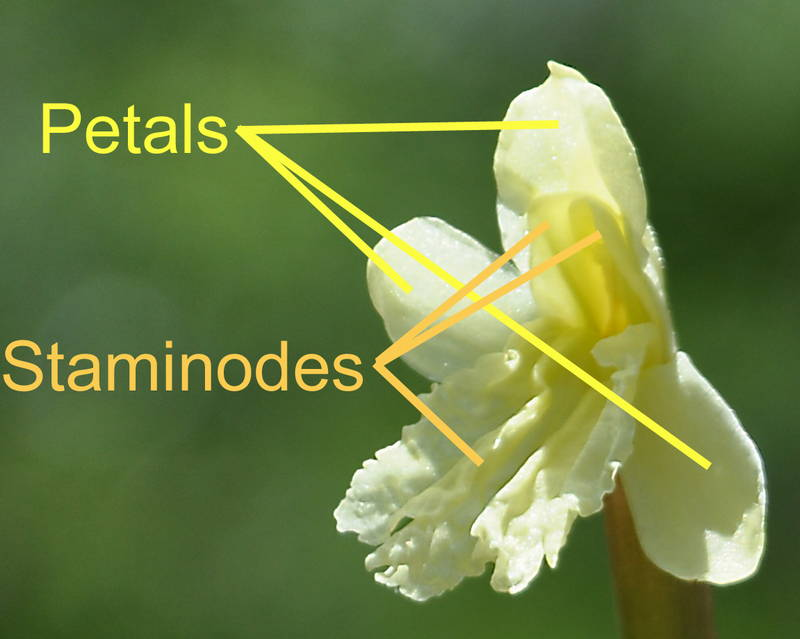
Flower of Roscoea cautleyoides showing the petals and staminodes

The single fertile stamen has a short filament bearing a cylindrical anther. The connective tissue between the anther's two pollen sacs extends outwards at its base to form spurs. The ovary has three "cells" or locules, eventually producing many small arillate seeds. The single functional style extends upwards through a grove in the stamen to appear above its top.

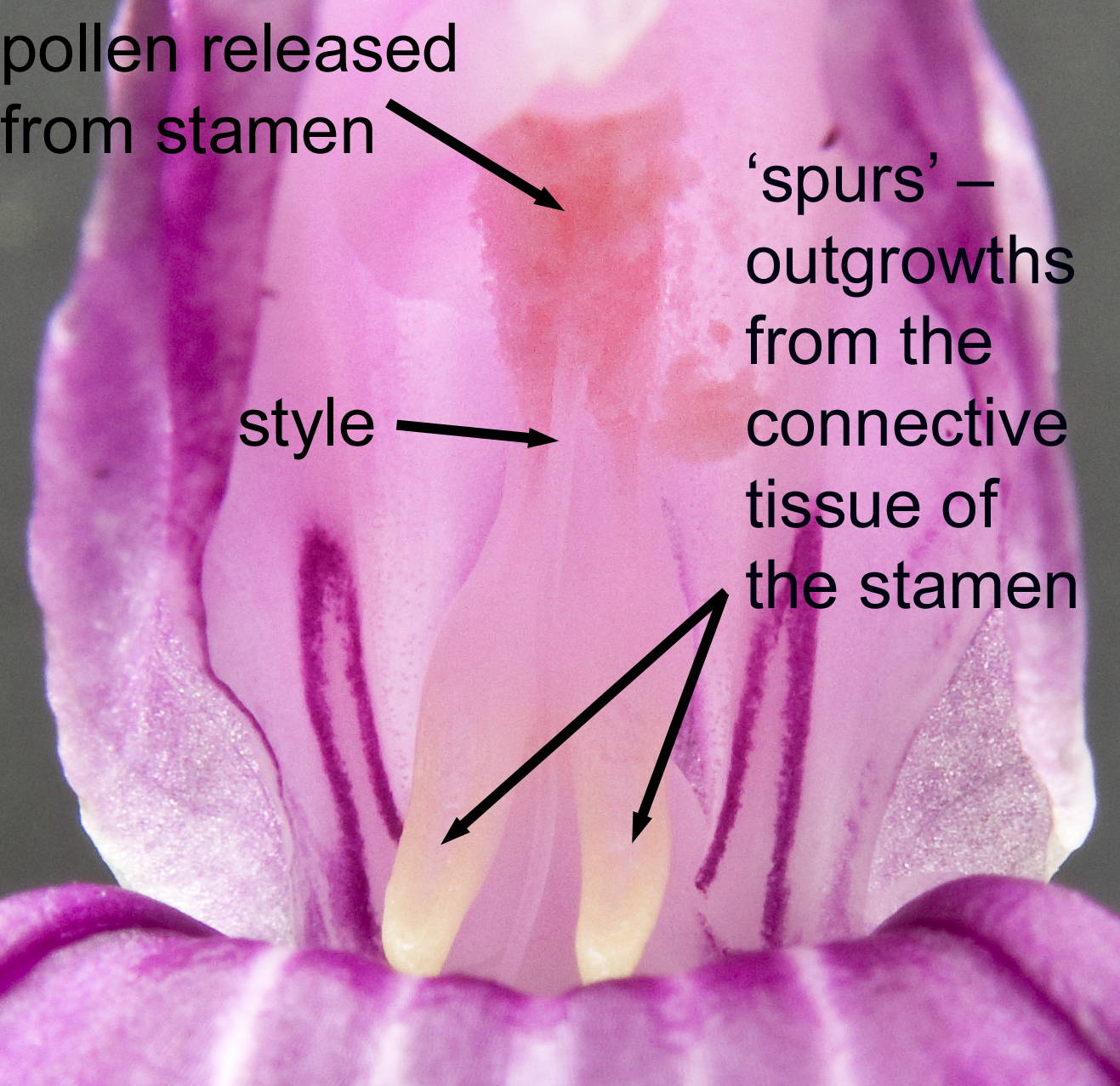
Flower of Roscoea auriculata showing the "spurs" on the stamen

=== Flower structure and pollination ===
The orchid-like flowers with a long floral tube appear to be an adaptation for pollination by long-tongued insects specializing in this type of flower. The design of the flower suggests that the lip acts as a landing platform and that if a pollinator puts its head into the flower in order to obtain nectar, it will push down on the spurs on the stamen, causing the anther (and the stigma which is held in front of it) to bend over and contact the insect's back. However, in the only two species so far studied in detail (R. cautleyoides and R. humeana), the actual pollinators were short-tongued pollen-collecting bees. In at least one species, R. schneideriana, it has been shown that if cross-pollination does not occur, the stigma bends over towards the anthers, thus effecting self-pollination. One suggestion is that although the original pollinators may have been long-tongued insects, these are now absent from at least some of the areas where Roscoea occurs, so that the genus has been able to survive in its alpine habitats through the presence of generalist pollinators and self-compatibility.

== Taxonomy ==
Roscoea was named by the English botanist James Edward Smith in 1806. The type species is R. purpurea. The name honours Smith's friend William Roscoe, the founder of the Liverpool Botanic Garden (remnants of which can now be found at Croxteth Hall). Roscoe is known to have been interested in "gingers" (Zingiberales) and to have grown a number of collections of this group of plants.

== Evolution and phylogeny ==
A 2002 classification of the family Zingiberaceae, based on molecular phylogenetic analysis, placed Roscoea in the tribe Zingibereae, subfamily Zingiberoideae. It was most closely related to the genus Cautleya, and then to Rhynchanthus, Pommereschea and Hedychium. The family is mainly tropical in distribution. The unusual mountainous distribution of Roscoea and the closely related Cautleya may have evolved relatively recently as a response to the uplift taking place in the region in the last 50 million years or so due to the collision of the Indian and Asian tectonic plates. A molecular phylogenetic analysis of 15 species of Roscoea, based on nuclear ribosomal DNA, showed that the genus was monophyletic, and distinct from the closely related genus Cautleya. The 15 species fell into two clear groups, a Himalayan clade and a Chinese clade (which includes one species from Burma, R. australis).

- - Cautleya
  - - - - R. auriculata
        - R. alpina
      - - R. brandisii
        - - R. purpurea
          - - R. tumjensis
            - - R. capitata
              - R. ganeshensis
    - - R. tibetica
      - - R. schneideriana
        - - R. scillifolia
          - - R. australis
            - - R. cautleyoides
              - R. wardii
              - R. humeana
              - R. praecox

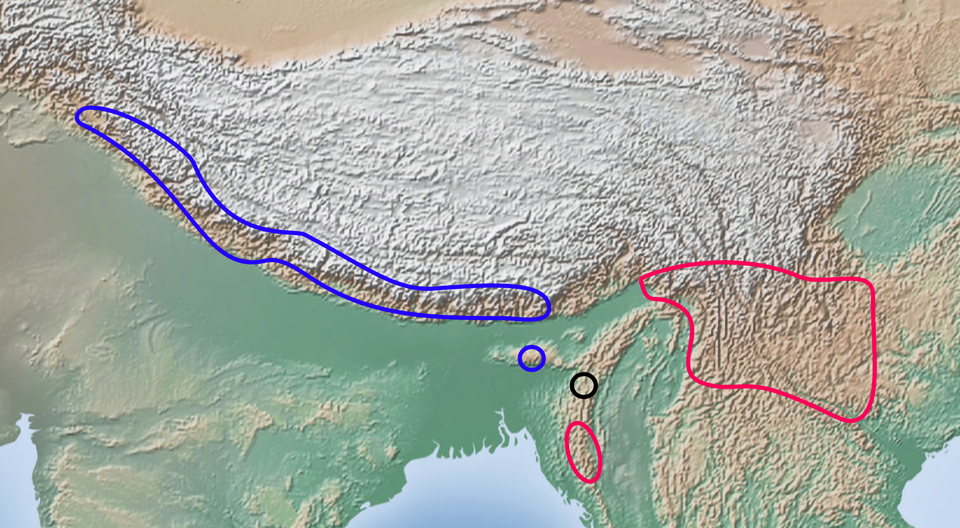
Distribution of Roscoea according to Ngamriabsakul, Newman & Cronk (2000); Himalayan clade shown in blue, Chinese clade shown in red. Black circle marks the distribution of R. ngainoi, discovered later.

The two clades correspond to a geographical separation, the main distributions being divided by the section of the Brahmaputra River which flows south at the end of the Himalayan mountain chain. A historical biogeography study revealed that the evolutionary split between Cautleya and Roscoea occurred during the middle and late Eocene to the early Oligocene, coinciding with the proposed early uplift of the Himalayas and Qinghai–Tibetan Plateau. Roscoea species were then divided into two distinct clades, simultaneous with the rapid extrusion of Indochina and accompanied by another Himalayan uplift around the Oligocene/Miocene boundary. It has been suggested that the genus may have originated in this area and then spread westwards along the Himalayas and eastwards into the mountains of China and its southern neighbours, supported by biogeographic reconstruction. Three species have an isolated distribution. R. brandisii, a member of the Himalayan clade, occurs to the south of the rest of the clade in the Khasia Hills in the modern Indian state of Meghalaya (formerly part of the state of Assam). R. australis, a member of the Chinese clade, occurs even further south, in the Chin Hills of Burma. R. ngainoi, discovered after the phylogenetic analysis discussed above, is found roughly in an area in-between these two species, in the Indian state of Manipur.

The material of R. tibetica included in the analysis came from Chinese sources. Later research showed that plants from Bhutan and southern Tibet which had previously been considered to be R. tibetica were actually a new species, R. bhutanica, which belongs to the Himalayan clade. There are few clear-cut morphological differences between the two clades; one is that compared to the Himalayan group, members of the Chinese clade have a larger number of bladeless leaves (i.e. leaves which have only a sheath forming part of the pseudostem).

== Species ==
As of August 2024, the Plants of the World Online accepts the following species of Roscoea:

- Roscoea alpina Royle
- Roscoea auriculata K.Schum.
- Roscoea australis Cowley
- Roscoea bhutanica Ngamr.
- Roscoea brandisii (King ex Baker) K.Schum.
- Roscoea capitata Sm.
- Roscoea cautleyoides Gagnep.
- Roscoea debilis Gagnep.
- Roscoea forrestii Cowley (including Roscoea cangshanensis M.H.Luo, X.F.Gao & H.H.Lin)
- Roscoea ganeshensis Cowley & W.J.Baker
- Roscoea glaucifolia F.J.Mou
- Roscoea humeana Balf.f. & W.W.Sm.
- Roscoea kunmingensis S.Q.Tong
- Roscoea megalantha Tosh.Yoshida & Yangzom
- Roscoea nepalensis Cowley
- Roscoea ngainoi A.A.Mao & Bhaumik
- Roscoea praecox K.Schum.
- Roscoea pubescens Z.Y.Zhu
- Roscoea purpurea Sm.
- Roscoea schneideriana (Loes.) Cowley
- Roscoea scillifolia (Gagnep.) Cowley
- Roscoea stenophylla Y.L.Fan
- Roscoea tibetica Batalin
- Roscoea tumjensis Cowley
- Roscoea wardii Cowley

The hybrid R. auriculata × R. cautleyoides has occurred in cultivation, and has been given the name R. × beesiana Cowley & C.Whitehouse.

Variation among the species

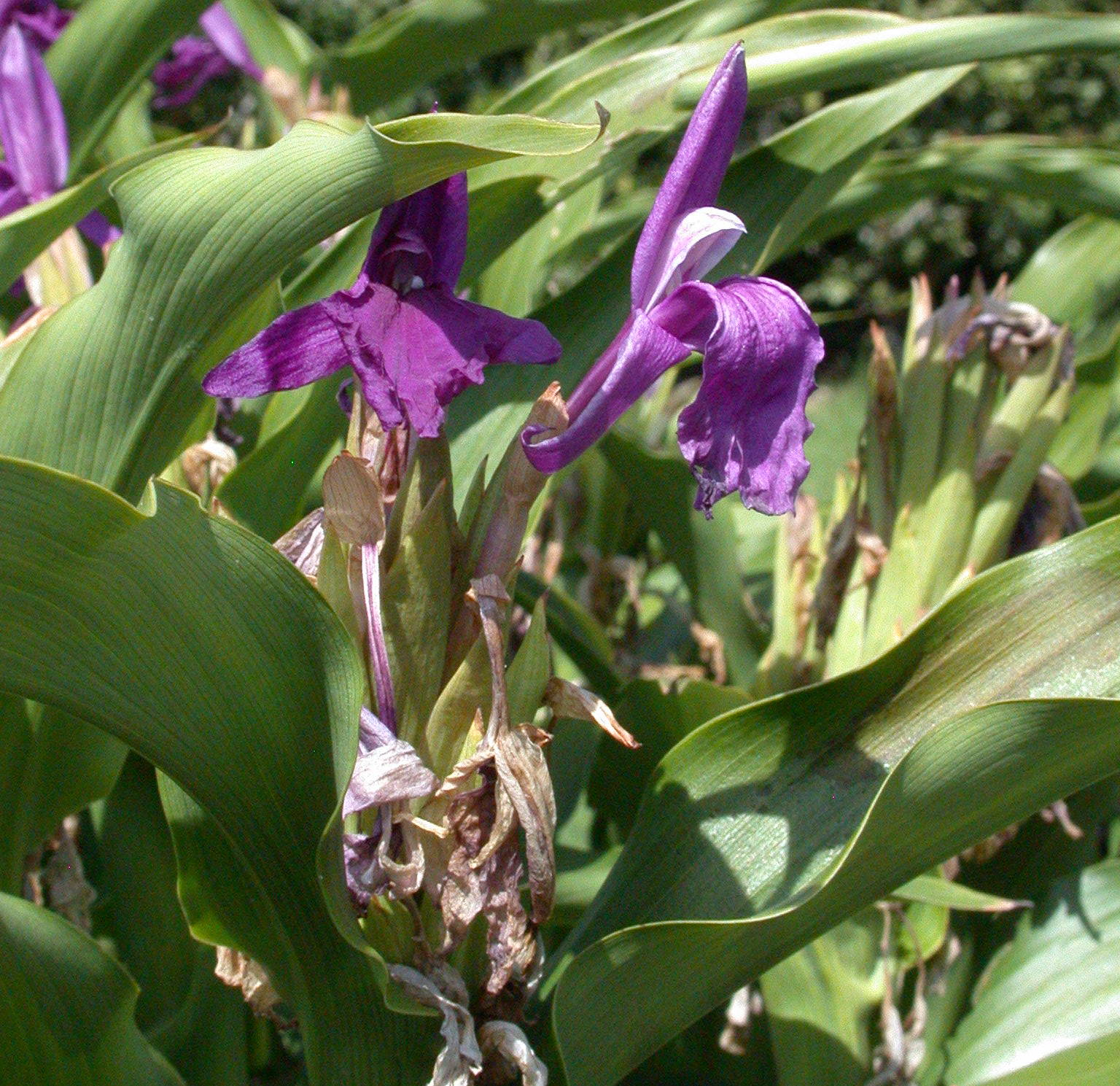
Roscoea auriculata K.Schum.

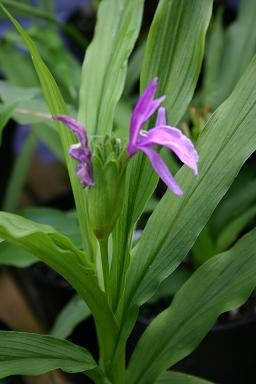
Roscoea capitata Sm.

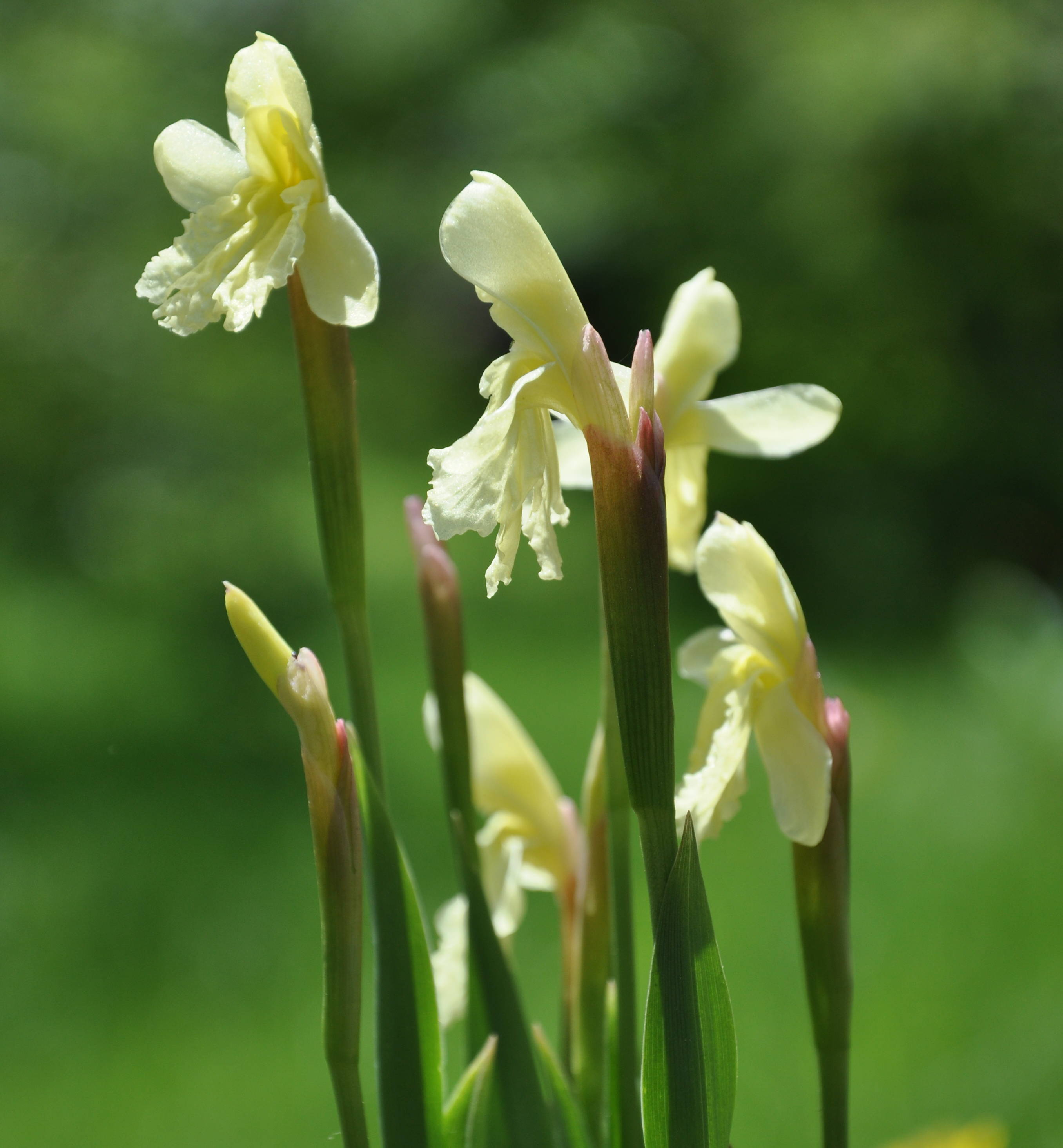
Roscoea cautleyoides Gagnep.

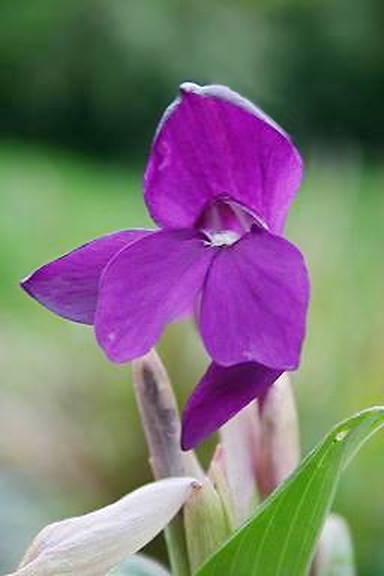
Roscoea humeana Balf.f. & W.W.Sm.

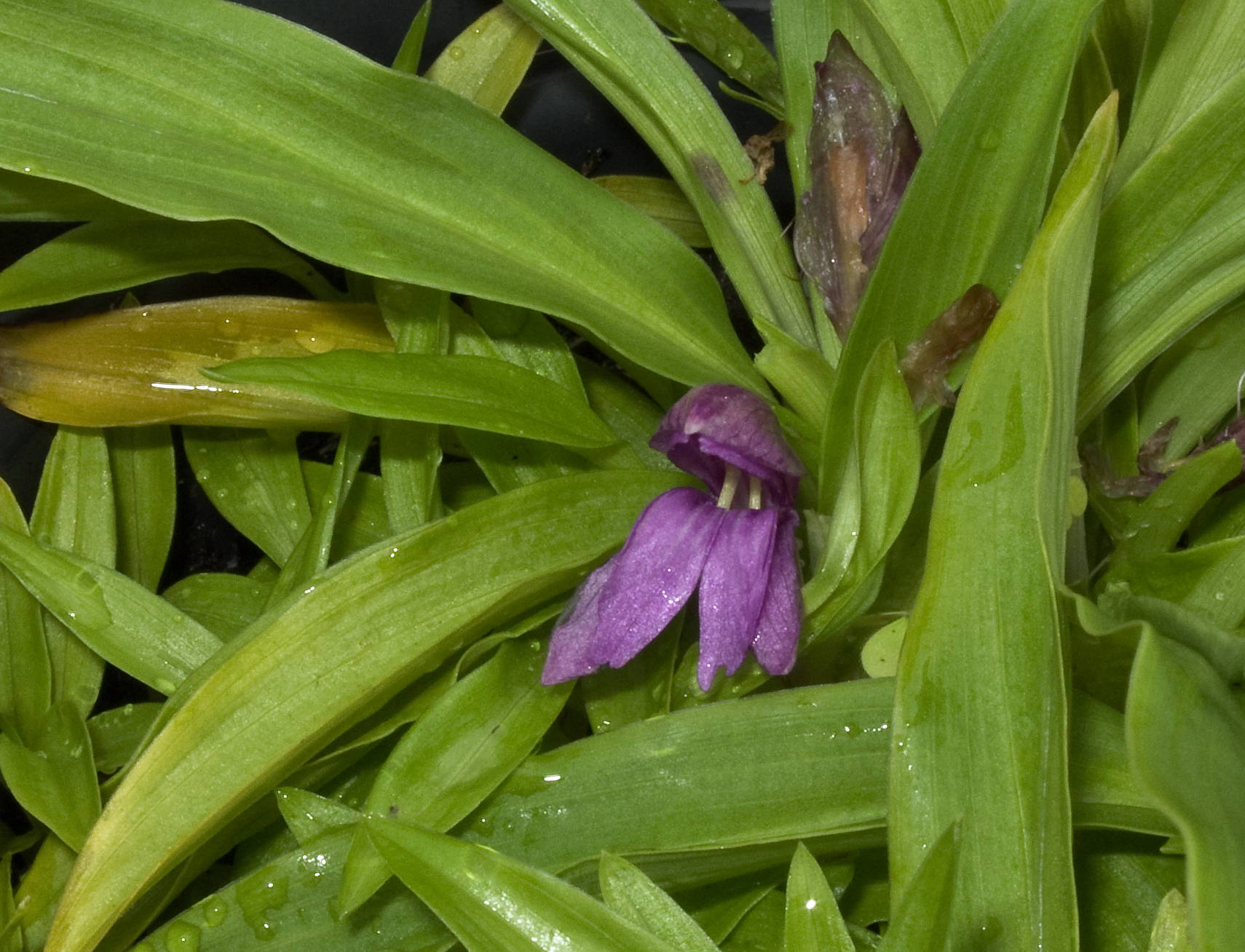
Roscoea kunmingensis S.Q.Tong

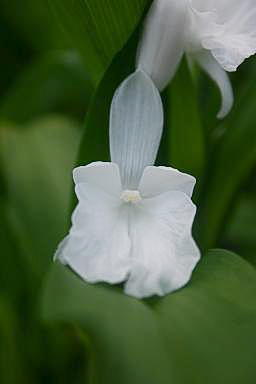
Roscoea nepalensis Cowley

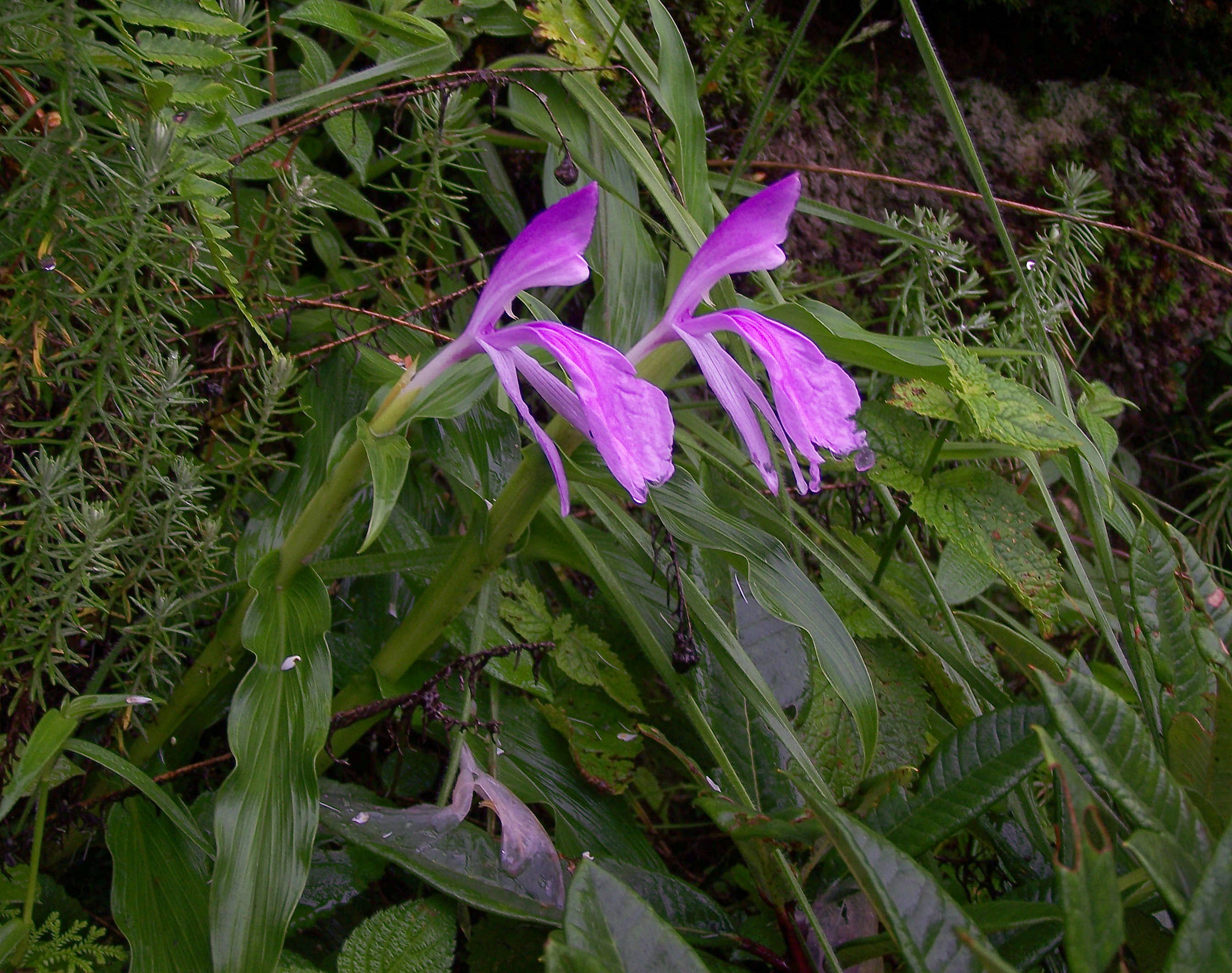
Roscoea purpurea Sm.

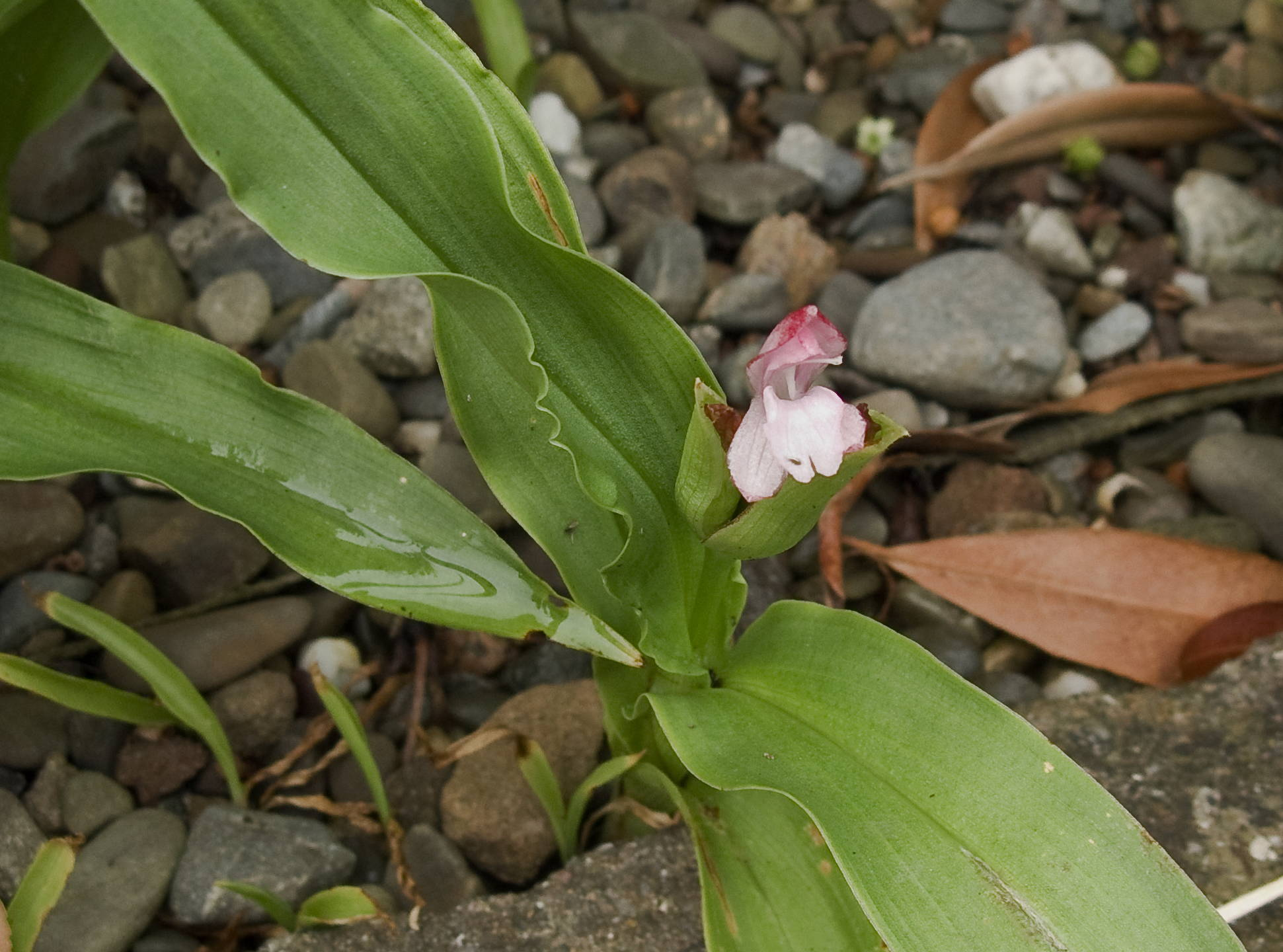
Roscoea scillifolia (Gagnep.) Cowley

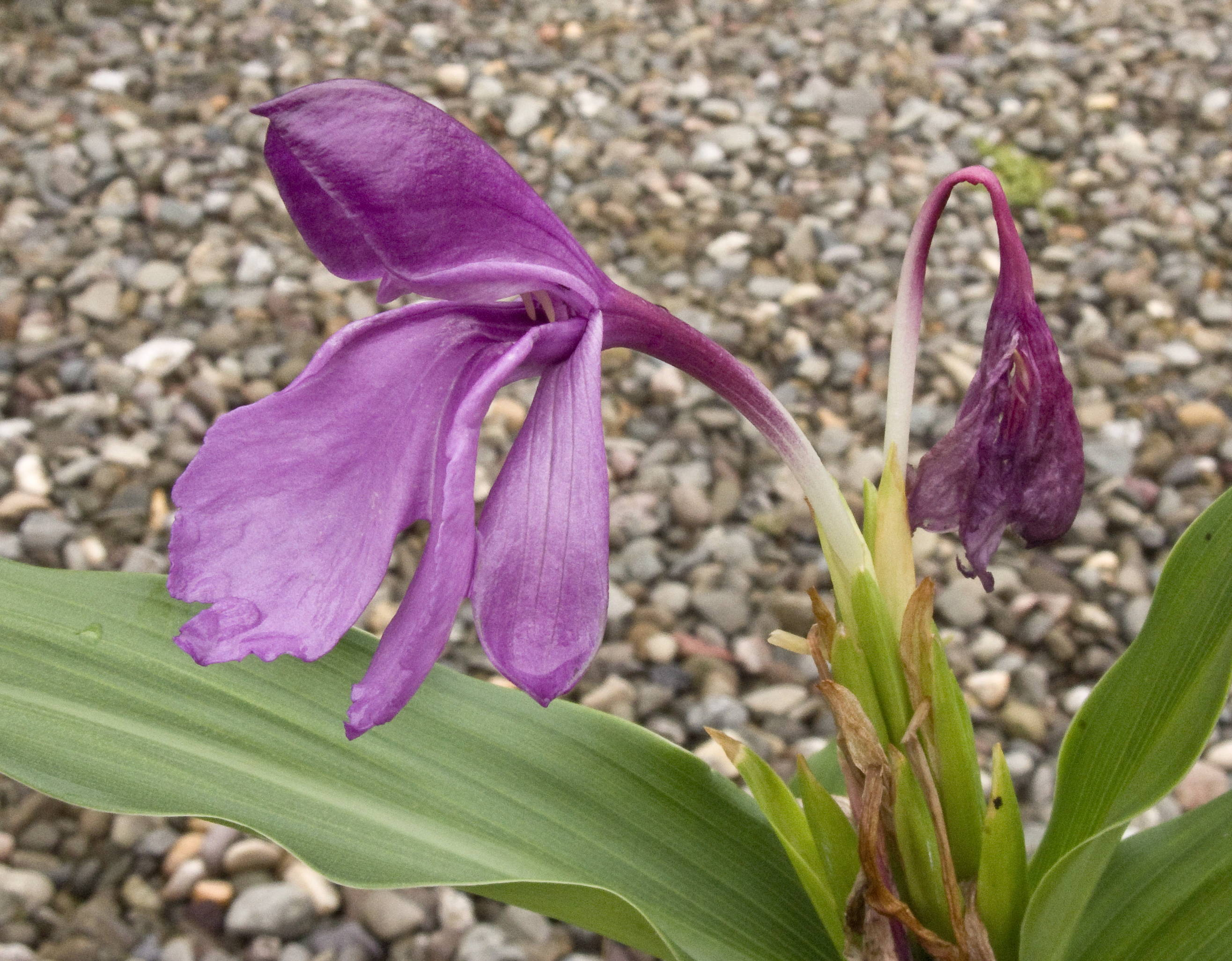
Roscoea tumjensis Cowley

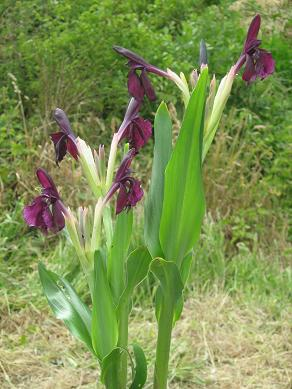
Roscoea wardii Cowley

== Cultivation ==
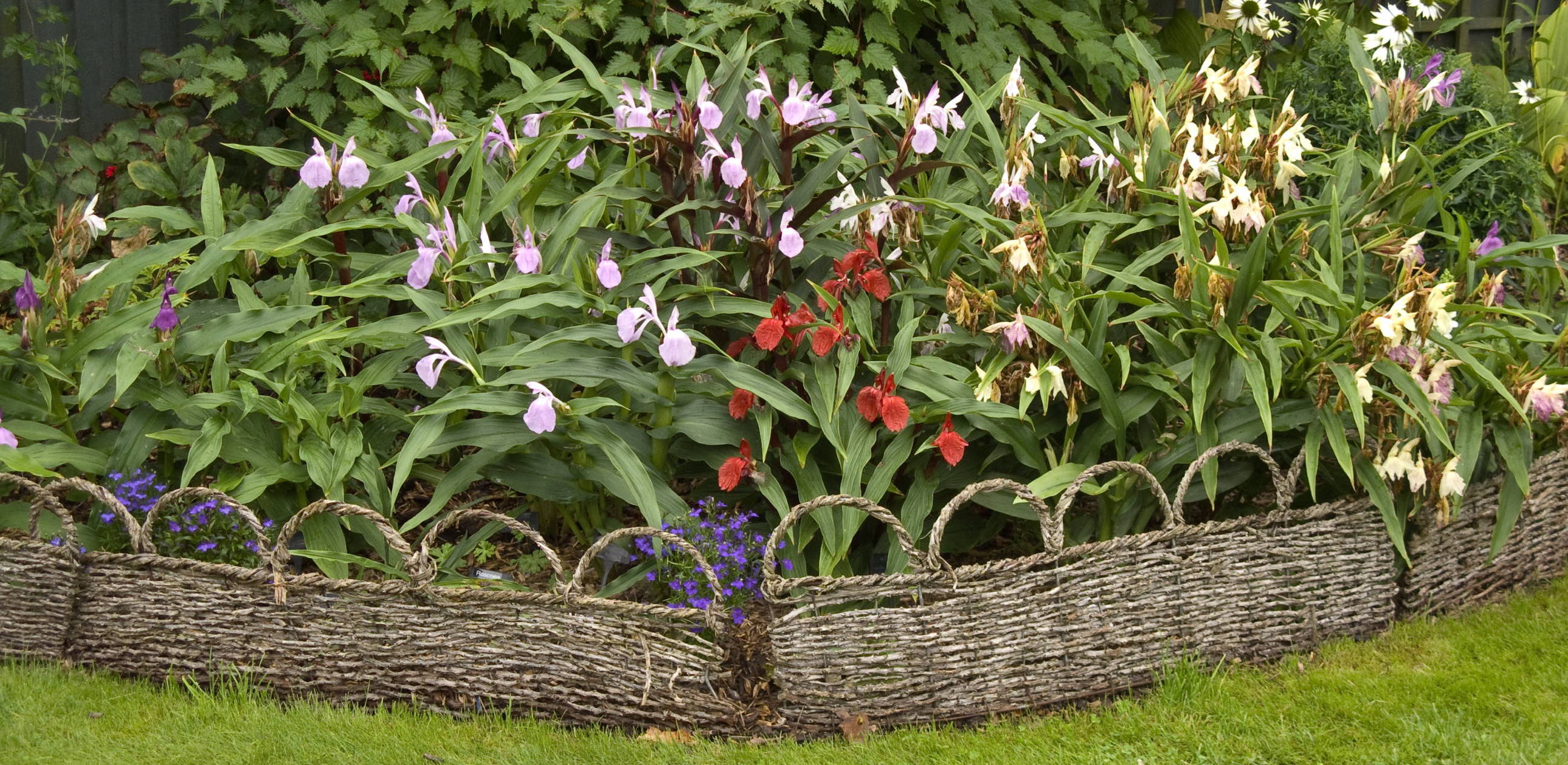
Roscoeas in cultivation

Some Roscoea species and cultivars are grown in gardens, particularly rock gardens, as ornamental plants. Coming from monsoon regions, they require moisture in the summer but relatively dry conditions in winter. A moisture-retaining but well-drained soil is recommended, with a mulch of a material such as bark. They vary in their tolerance of sun exposure, most requiring shade for at least part of the day. In a Royal Horticultural Society trial, R. ganeshensis and R. purpurea f. rubra were the most harmed by excessive sunlight; R. cautleyoides, R. × beesiana and R. scillifolia the most resistant. In cultivation they do not appear above ground until late spring or even early summer; thus if planted deeply enough, up to 15 cm (6 in), they escape frost damage in regions where subzero temperatures occur. Different species and cultivars then flower throughout late spring and summer into early autumn.

They can be propagated by careful division in the autumn of the individual growth points produced by a large plant, or by seed. Seed should not be allowed to dry out. If sown immediately upon ripening, it will normally germinate in the following summer. Young plants should be potted on before the tuberous roots become too intertwined.

=== RHS trial ===
From 2009 to 2011, the Royal Horticultural Society held a trial involving around 100 entries submitted by British and other European sources. All proved hardy (rating H4, i.e. hardy anywhere in the British Isles). The Award of Garden Merit was given to 17 entries:

- R. auriculata and its cultivar 'Summer Deep Purple'
- R. × beesiana
- Cultivars of R. cautleyoides – 'Abigail Bloom', 'Himalaya', 'Jeffrey Thomas' and, subject to availability, 'Purple Queen'
- R. forrestii
- Forms and cultivars of R. humeana – f. humeana, f. lutea and f. tyria and, subject to availability, the cultivar 'Stephanie Bloom'
- A form and cultivars of R. purpurea – f. rubra, cultivars 'Dalai Lama', 'Helen Lamb' and 'Red Neck'
- Subject to availability, R. wardii
- Three cultivars whose origins are unclear – R. 'Hartington Raw Silk', R. 'Kew Beauty' (possibly a hybrid between R. cautleyoides and R. humeana) and, subject to availability, R. 'McBeath's Pink'.

== Bibliography ==
- Cowley, E.J. (1982), "A revision of Roscoea (Zingiberaceae)", Kew Bulletin, 36 (4): 747–777, Bibcode:1982KewBu..36..747C, doi:10.2307/4117918, JSTOR 4117918
- Cowley, Jill (2007), The genus Roscoea, Royal Botanic Gardens, Kew, ISBN 978-1-84246-134-1
