= Roscoea ganeshensis =

Scientific classification
- Kingdom: Plantae
- Clade: Tracheophytes
- Clade: Angiosperms
- Clade: Monocots
- Clade: Commelinids
- Order: Zingiberales
- Family: Zingiberaceae
- Genus: Roscoea
- Species: R. ganeshensis

Binomial name
- Roscoea ganeshensis Cowley & W.J.Baker

Species of flowering plant

Roscoea ganeshensis is a perennial herbaceous plant occurring in Ganesh Himal (part of the Himalayas) in central Nepal. Most members of the ginger family (Zingiberaceae), to which it belongs, are tropical, but like other species of Roscoea, R. ganeshensis grows in much colder mountainous regions. It is used as an ornamental garden plant, requiring moisture and shade in the summer.

== Description ==
Roscoea ganeshensis is a perennial herbaceous plant. Like all members of the genus Roscoea, it grows from a short rhizome, to which the tuberous roots are attached. When growth begins again, "pseudostems" are produced: structures which resemble stems but are actually formed from the tightly wrapped bases (sheaths) of its leaves. R. ganeshensis is usually 12–15 cm tall, with five to six leaves. The blade of the leaf (the part free from the pseudostem) is 6–20 cm long by 2.7–5.3 cm wide. The leaf sheaths are wrinkled (rugose) and yellowish-green in colour. At the junction of the blade and sheath there are small transparent structures (ligules), 0.5–2 mm high.

In its native habitats, R. ganeshensis is thought to flower between August and September. The stem (peduncle) of the flower spike does not emerge from the leaf sheaths. Several purple flowers are produced, sometimes with a darker mark at the base of the lip or labellum. Yellow-green bracts, 8–13 cm long subtend the flowers.

Each flower has the typical structure for Roscoea (see that article for labelled images). There is a tube-shaped outer calyx, about 5–8 cm long. Next the three petals (the corolla) form a tube about 8.5 cm long, terminating in three petal lobes: an upright central lobe and two slightly shorter side lobes. The central lobe is about 3–3.5 cm long by 1–1.4 cm wide, and is paler on the outside with nine purple veins, purple on the inside at the top with purple and white stripes below. The side lobes are 2.7–3.1 cm long by 0.6–0.9 cm wide, also purple and paler at the base. Inside the petals are structures formed from four sterile stamens (staminodes). Two lateral staminodes form what appear to be small petals, about 1.6–2 cm long including a 0.2–0.5 cm narrowed "claw" at the base. Two central staminodes are fused at the base to form a lip or labellum, about 3.6–4.5 cm long by 2.5–3.5 cm wide. The labellum is purple with a "crumpled" surface and is split at the end for up to 1.5 cm into two lobes.

The single functional stamen is white with a linear anther, about 8 mm long, borne on a 4–5 mm long filament. A short cream spur is formed from the connective tissue between the two capsules of the anther, about 1.5–3 mm long. The three-celled ovary is 5–11 mm long.

R. ganeshensis can be distinguished from similar species of Roscoea by its very short internodes, leaves covered with fine hairs and the appearance of the labellum, which is crumpled with very distinct "shoulders" on its upper corners.

== Taxonomy ==
R. ganeshensis was first described by Jill Cowley and William Baker in 1996. The specific epithet ganeshensis is derived from the location where the species was first found, the Ganesh Himal in central Nepal. R. ganeshensis resembles a smaller version of R. purpurea, which grows in the same location.

== Evolution and phylogeny ==
The family Zingiberaceae is mainly tropical in distribution. The unusual mountainous distribution of Roscoea may have evolved relatively recently and be a response to the uplift taking place in the region in the last 50 million years or so due to the collision of the Indian and Asian tectonic plates.

Species of Roscoea divide into two clear groups, a Himalayan clade and a "Chinese" clade (which includes some species from outside China). The two clades correspond to a geographical separation, their main distributions being divided by the Brahmaputra River as it flows south at the end of the Himalayan mountain chain. It has been suggested that the genus may have originated in this area and then spread westwards along the Himalayas and eastwards into the mountains of China and its southern neighbours. R. ganeshensis falls into the Himalayan clade as would be expected from its distribution. It appears to be most closely related to R. capitata, although it has been described as resembling a "stunted" R. purpurea.

== Distribution and habitat ==
According to Cowley (2007), Roscoea ganeshensis is only known from one locality, the Buri Gandaki valley in the Ganesh Himal, central Nepal, where it occurs at about 1,900 metres on a steep rocky bank.

== Cultivation ==
R. ganeshensis is in cultivation as an ornamental plant. General recommendations for the cultivation of roscoeas are a moisture-retaining but well-drained soil, with a mulch of a material such as bark, and shade for at least part of the day. The species was included in a Royal Horticultural Society trial of Roscoea species and cultivars in 2009–2011. Although it had been awarded a "Preliminary Commendation" in 1999, it was not given an award in the trial. It was noted that although it remained healthy, it did not increase well, needing more shade and moisture than was provided.

== Bibliography ==
- Cowley, Jill (2007), The genus Roscoea, Royal Botanic Gardens, Kew, ISBN 978-1-84246-134-1
