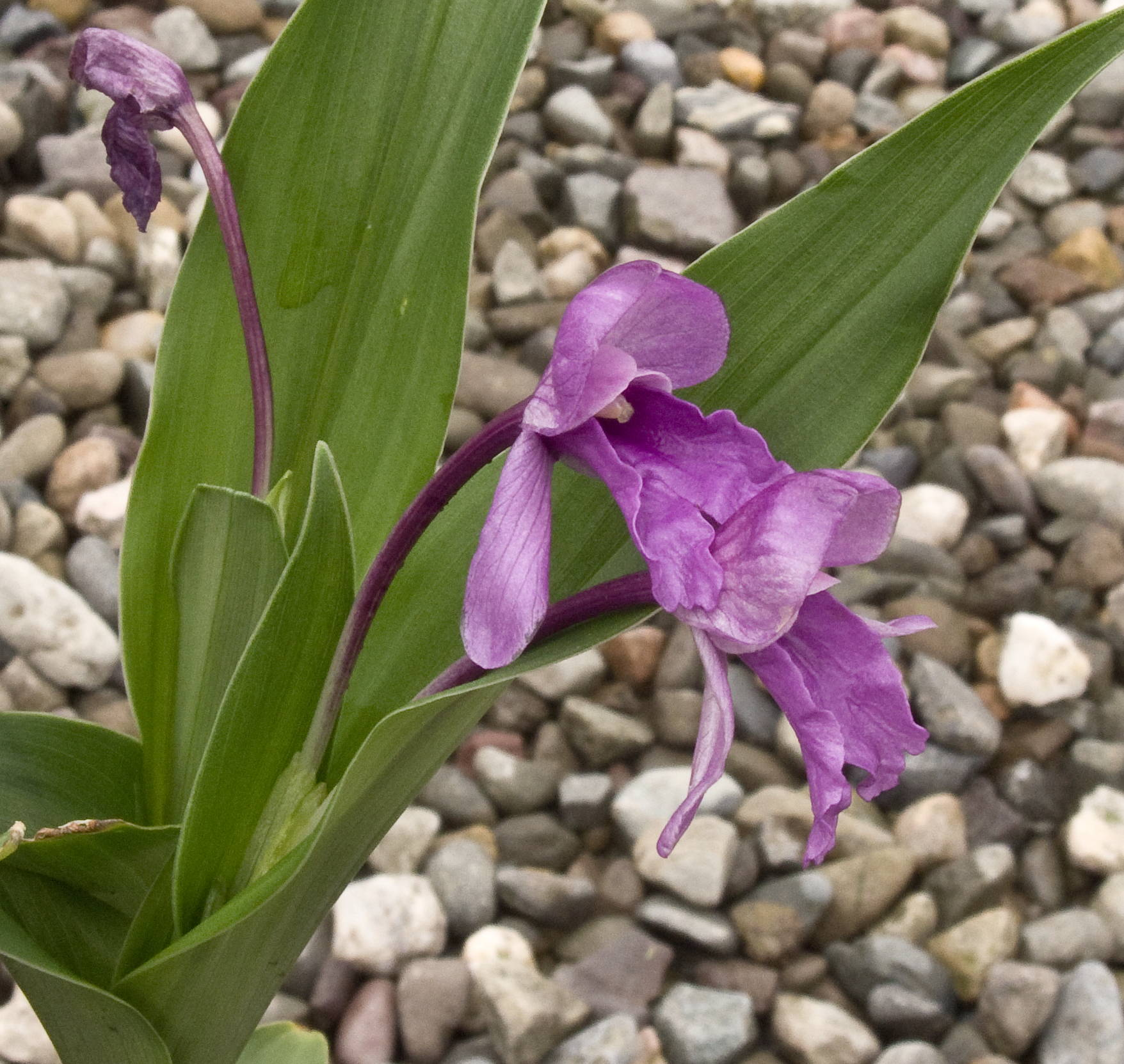
- In cultivation

Scientific classification
- Kingdom: Plantae
- Clade: Tracheophytes
- Clade: Angiosperms
- Clade: Monocots
- Clade: Commelinids
- Order: Zingiberales
- Family: Zingiberaceae
- Genus: Roscoea
- Species: R. alpina

Binomial name
- Roscoea alpina Royle

= Roscoea alpina =

Species of plant

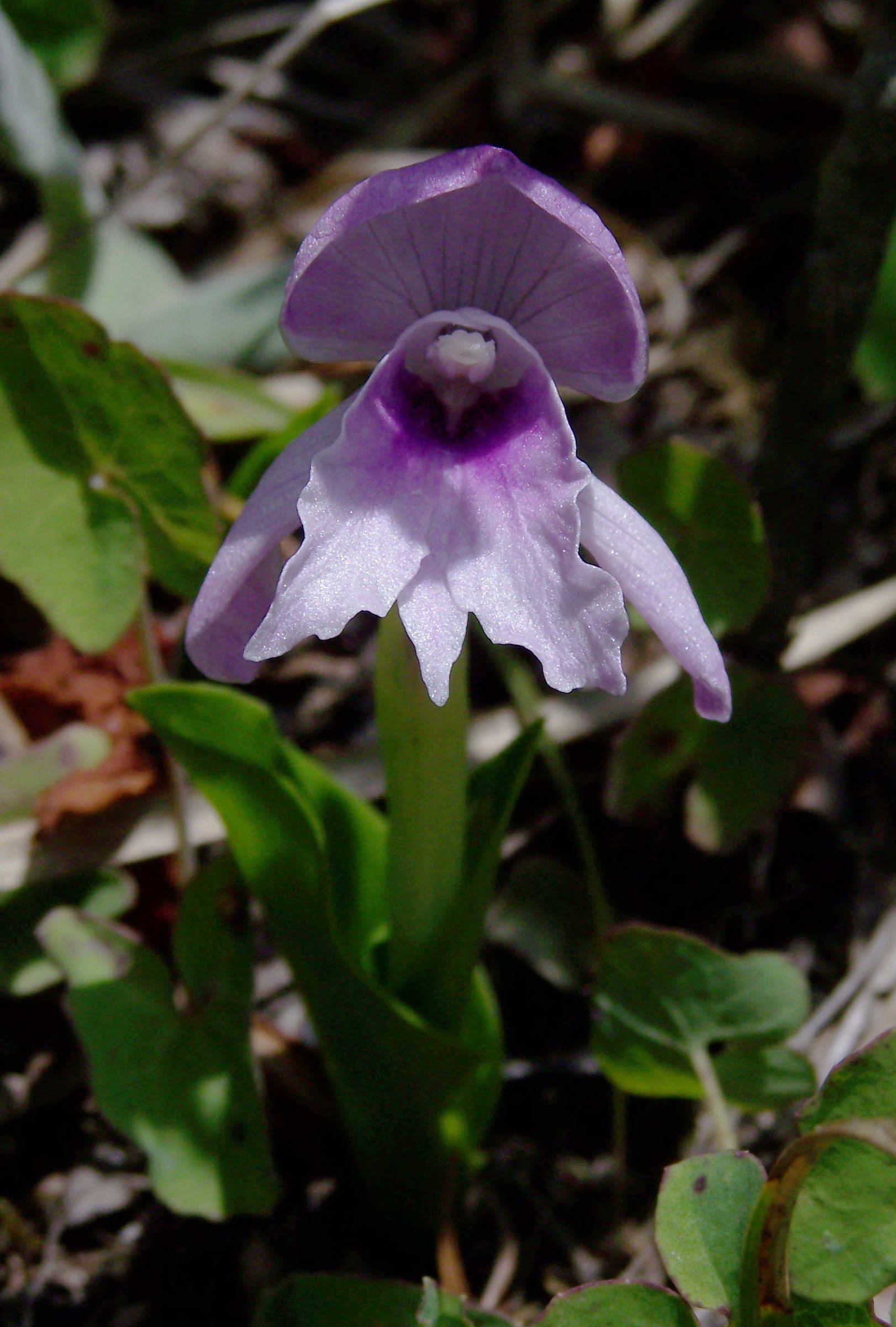
Roscoea alpina in Nepal (labellum appears to be trilobed)

Roscoea alpina is a perennial herbaceous plant native to the Himalayas. Most members of the ginger family (Zingiberaceae), to which it belongs, are tropical, but R. alpina, like other species of Roscoea, grows in much colder mountainous regions. It is sometimes grown as an ornamental plant in gardens.

== Description ==
Roscoea alpina is a perennial herbaceous plant. Like all members of the genus Roscoea, it dies back each year to a short vertical rhizome, to which are attached the tuberous roots. When growth begins again, "pseudostems" are produced: structures which resemble stems but are actually formed from the tightly wrapped bases (sheaths) of its leaves. R. alpina is one of the smaller members of the genus; plants are 10–20 cm tall, with four to six leaves. The first two or three leaves consist only of a sheath; the remaining two or three have in addition a smooth (glabrous) leaf blade, free from the pseudostem, 3–12 cm long by 1.2–2 cm wide. There is a very small ligule, extending to about 0.5 mm, at the junction of the leaf sheath and blade. The leaf blades taper to a point.

In its native habitats, R. alpina flowers between May and August. The stem (peduncle) of the flower spike is hidden by the leaf sheaths. At the base of the flower spike there is a small bract, 3–10 mm long. Flowers open in succession and are purple or lilac in colour.

Each flower has the typical structure for Roscoea (see the diagrams in that article). There is a tube-shaped outer calyx, 4–5 cm long with a two-lobed apex. Next the three petals (the corolla) form a tube which is longer than the calyx and terminates in three lobes, an upright more-or-less circular central lobe, about 1.5 cm in diameter (which forms a hood over the rest of the flower), and two more elongated side lobes. Inside the petals are structures formed from four sterile stamens (staminodes): two lateral staminodes form what appear to be upright petals, smaller than the corolla lobes; two central staminodes are fused to form a lip or labellum, about 1.5 cm long, which is divided at the end into two lobes.

The single functional stamen has a white or cream anther, about 5–6 mm long, with 1.5–2 mm long spurs formed from the connective tissue between the two capsules of the anther. The ovary expands to a 2.5–3.5 cm long capsule when seed is set.

== Taxonomy ==
Roscoea alpina was first described scientifically in 1839 by John Forbes Royle, a British botanist who was born in India and worked for the East India Company. The specific epithet refers to the alpine habitat of the species.

For a long time R. scillifolia was incorrectly known in horticulture as R. alpina; Cowley (2007) cites articles written in 1938, the 1960s and 1970, all of which use this name for what is actually R. scillifolia.

== Evolution and phylogeny ==
The family Zingiberaceae is mainly tropical in distribution. The unusual mountainous distribution of Roscoea may have evolved relatively recently and be a response to the uplift taking place in the region in the last 50 million years or so due to the collision of the Indian and Asian tectonic plates.

Species of Roscoea divide into two clear groups, a Himalayan clade and a "Chinese" clade (which includes some species from outside China). The two clades correspond to a geographical separation, their main distributions being divided by the Brahmaputra River as it flows south at the end of the Himalayan mountain chain. It has been suggested that the genus may have originated in this area and then spread westwards along the Himalayas and eastwards into the mountains of China and its southern neighbours. R. alpina falls into the Himalayan clade as would be expected from its distribution. It appears to be closely related to R. auriculata.

== Distribution and habitat ==
Roscoea alpina is found all along the Himalayas, in Kashmir, Tibet, India, Nepal, Sikkim and Bhutan (the Flora of China includes Burma). In Tibet it grows in coniferous forests between 3,000 and 3,600 metres.

== Cultivation ==
Some Roscoea species and cultivars, including R. alpina, are grown in rock gardens. They generally require a relatively sunny position with moisture-retaining but well-drained soil. As they do not appear above ground until late spring or even early summer, they escape frost damage in regions where subzero temperatures occur. When grown at Royal Botanic Gardens, Kew, R. alpina requires more shade than other species of Roscoea. It flowers in late spring to early summer, the leaves elongating afterwards. White forms are known.

The height reached in cultivation, up to 40 cm, exceeds that given for the species in the wild, where it is said to reach only 20 cm.

For propagation, see Roscoea: Cultivation.

== Bibliography ==
- Cowley, Jill (1997), "Plate 314. Roscoea alpina", Curtis's Botanical Magazine, 14 (2): 77–81, doi:10.1111/1467-8748.00070
- Cowley, Jill (2007), The genus Roscoea, Royal Botanic Gardens, Kew, ISBN 978-1-84246-134-1
