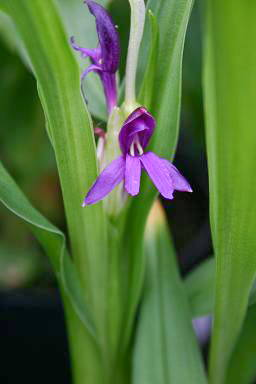

Scientific classification
- Kingdom: Plantae
- Clade: Tracheophytes
- Clade: Angiosperms
- Clade: Monocots
- Clade: Commelinids
- Order: Zingiberales
- Family: Zingiberaceae
- Genus: Roscoea
- Species: R. tibetica

Binomial name
- Roscoea tibetica Batalin

= Roscoea tibetica =

Species of flowering plant

Roscoea tibetica is a perennial herbaceous plant native to the mountains of China, being found in Tibet, Sichuan and Yunnan. The species formerly included plants found in Bhutan; in 2000, these were separated into a new species, Roscoea bhutanica. Most members of the ginger family (Zingiberaceae), to which it belongs, are tropical, but R. tibetica, like other species of Roscoea, grows in much colder mountainous regions. R. tibetica is sometimes grown as an ornamental plant in gardens. In 2020, it was proposed that R. tibetica be split again.

== Description ==
Roscoea tibetica is a perennial herbaceous plant. Like all members of the genus Roscoea, it dies back each year to a short vertical rhizome, to which are attached the tuberous roots. When growth begins again, "pseudostems" are produced: structures which resemble stems but are actually formed from the tightly wrapped bases (sheaths) of its leaves. R. tibetica is one of the smaller members of the genus; plants are 5–15 cm tall, with one to three leaves, which have blades 2–6 cm long by 1–2.5 cm wide. The blade is more-or-less hairy; more so when young. There is a very small ligule, extending to about 0.5 mm, at the junction of the leaf sheath and blade.

In its native habitats, R. tibetica flowers between June and July. The stem (peduncle) of the flower spike is hidden by the leaf sheaths. Bracts some 2.2–4 cm long enclose the flowers, which are purple or violet and appear just above the leaves.

Each flower has the typical structure for Roscoea (see the diagrams in that article). There is a tube-shaped outer calyx, brown-spotted and 3–4 cm long with a three-toothed apex. Next the three petals (the corolla) form a tube which is longer than the calyx at 4–5 cm and terminates in three lobes, a narrow upright central lobe, about 1.5–1.7 cm long, forming a hood, and two side lobes, each 1.5–1.8 cm long by 4–5 mm wide. Inside the petals are structures formed from four sterile stamens (staminodes): two lateral staminodes form what appear to be upright petals, 1–1.3 cm long; two central staminodes are fused to form a lip or labellum, about 1.4–2.5 cm by 0.8–1.8 cm, which is divided into two lobes for more than half its length.

The single functional stamen has a cream anther, about 5–6 mm long, with 3–7 mm long spurs formed from the connective tissue between the two capsules of the anther. The cylinder-shaped ovary is about 1.5 cm long.

== Taxonomy ==
Roscoea tibetica was first described scientifically in 1895 by Alexander Theodorowicz Batalin, a Russian botanist. The specific epithet tibetica refers to the location in which the species was found.

As explained further below, in 2000, plants from areas south and west of the Brahmaputra River were separated off into a new species, R. bhutanica.

== Evolution and phylogeny ==
The family Zingiberaceae is mainly tropical in distribution. The unusual mountainous distribution of Roscoea may have evolved relatively recently and be a response to the uplift taking place in the region in the last 50 million years or so due to the collision of the Indian and Asian tectonic plates.

Species of Roscoea divide into two clear groups, a Himalayan clade and a "Chinese" clade (which includes some species from outside China). The two clades correspond to a geographical separation, their main distributions being divided by the Brahmaputra River as it flows south at the end of the Himalayan mountain chain. It has been suggested that the genus may have originated in this area and then spread westwards along the Himalayas and eastwards into the mountains of China and its southern neighbours.

R. tibetica was formerly thought to be unique in occurring on both sides of the south-flowing section of the Brahmaputra River. However, genetic analysis in 2000 showed that plants to the west, in Bhutan, were distinct from those to the east, in China. The former were placed in a new species, R. bhutanica. R. tibetica falls into the Chinese clade whereas R. bhutanica belongs to the Himalayan clade, as would be expected from their respective distributions.

The two species are superficially similar, in that they are both small and have a tight group of basal leaves. Young plants of the two species are not easily distinguished, but later it can be seen that while R. bhutanica develops leaves in two opposite rows, R. tibetica retains a rosette of leaves.

=== Possible split ===
In 2020, a study employing phylogenomic reconstruction, genetic structure analysis and species distribution models indicated that R. tibetica comprised two monophyletic groups, initially called lineage L and lineage T. The two lineages showed a deep divergence, and were separated by two other species in the cladogram presented in the study:

- - R. aff. australis
  - - R. tibetica lineage T
    - - - R. schneideriana
        - R. scillifolia
      - R. tibetica lineage L

There were also ecological differences between the lineages. It was proposed to separate lineage L as a new species, to be called "Roscoea lingbaoshanensis", although the name had not been published as of May 2020. Lineage T would be retained as Roscoea tibetica.

== Distribution and habitat ==
Roscoea tibetica is native to mountains in China north-east of the Brahmaputra River, in Tibet, Sichuan and Yunnan. It is found in pine forests, scrub and alpine meadows, at heights of 2,400–3,800 m.

== Cultivation ==
Some Roscoea species and cultivars are grown in rock gardens. They generally require a relatively sunny position with moisture-retaining but well-drained soil. As they do not appear above ground until late spring or even early summer, they escape frost damage in regions where subzero temperatures occur. Plants grown at the Royal Botanic Gardens, Kew as R. tibetica produced small dark purple flowers, one at a time, from early June to July. The plants were noted as being variable (it is not clear whether any were actually what is now R. bhutanica).

For propagation, see Roscoea: Cultivation.
