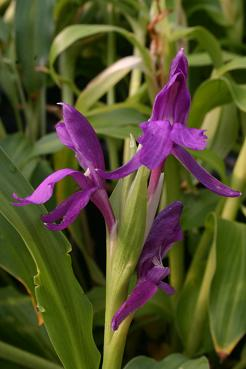
- In cultivation

Scientific classification
- Kingdom: Plantae
- Clade: Tracheophytes
- Clade: Angiosperms
- Clade: Monocots
- Clade: Commelinids
- Order: Zingiberales
- Family: Zingiberaceae
- Genus: Roscoea
- Species: R. debilis

Binomial name
- Roscoea debilis Gagnep.

Synonyms
- R. blanda K.Schum.

= Roscoea debilis =

Species of flowering plant

Roscoea debilis is a perennial herbaceous plant found in Yunnan, China. Most members of the ginger family (Zingiberaceae), to which it belongs, are tropical, but R. debilis, like other species of Roscoea, grows in much colder mountainous regions.

== Description ==
Roscoea debilis is a perennial herbaceous plant. Like all members of the genus Roscoea, it dies back each year to a short vertical rhizome, to which are attached the tuberous roots. When growth begins again, "pseudostems" are produced: structures which resemble stems but are actually formed from the tightly wrapped bases (sheaths) of its leaves. Plants are usually 25–50 cm (10–20 in) tall, occasionally as short 10 cm (3.9 in) or as tall as 60 cm (24 in). It has five to seven leaves. The first two or three consist only of pinkish brown sheaths; the remaining leaves have blades usually 9–22 cm (3.5–8.7 in) long by 1.5–4 cm (0.6–1.6 in) wide. The blades are narrowed at the base, appearing to form a stalk. At the junction of the blade and sheath there is a small pinkish brown ligule, extending to about 1–2 mm (0.04–0.08 in).

Flowers appear in June to August in the wild. The stem (peduncle) of the flower spike (inflorescence) is either held within the leaf sheaths or sometimes slightly extended from them. One to three flowers open together and are purple, red or white. The narrow bracts which subtend the flowers are 3.5–5.5 cm (1.4–2.2 in) long, longer than the calyx.

Each flower has the typical structure for Roscoea (see the diagrams in that article). There is a tube-shaped outer calyx, 2.7–3.5 cm (1.1–1.4 in) long, with a two-lobed apex. Next the three petals (the corolla) form a tube, longer than the calyx at 3.5–7.5 cm (1.4–3.0 in), terminating in three lobes, a hooded upright central lobe, about 2.2–3.5 cm (0.9–1.4 in) long and two similarly sized side lobes. Inside the petals are structures formed from four sterile stamens (staminodes): two lateral staminodes form what appear to be small upright petals, which are about 2.5 cm (1.0 in) long with a narrowed base; two central staminodes are fused to form a lip or labellum, 2.3–3.5 cm (0.9–1.4 in) long by about 1.4–3 cm (0.6–1.2 in) wide. The labellum bends slightly downwards and has a narrowed base for about 5–6 mm (0.2 in) after which there are some white lines. It is split into two narrow lobes at the end.

The single functional stamen has a white anther, about 6–9 mm (0.2–0.4 in) long, with 7–9 mm (0.3–0.4 in) long spurs formed from the connective tissue between the two capsules of the anther. The ovary is 1–1.5 cm (0.4–0.6 in) long.

== Taxonomy ==
Roscoea debilis was first described scientifically by François Gagnepain in a publication which appeared in 1902. The specific epithet debilis means "weak"; Gagnepain described it as "remarkable for its slenderness".

Two varieties are recognized. R. debilis var. debilis has leaf blades which are softly hairy (pubescent) on the underside; in R. debilis var. limprichtii they are hairless (glabrous).

== Evolution and phylogeny ==
The family Zingiberaceae is mainly tropical in distribution. The unusual mountainous distribution of Roscoea may have evolved relatively recently and be a response to the uplift taking place in the region in the last 50 million years or so due to the collision of the Indian and Asian tectonic plates.

Species of Roscoea divide into two clear groups, a Himalayan clade and a "Chinese" clade (which includes some species from outside China). The two clades correspond to a geographical separation, being divided by the Brahmaputra River as it flows south at the end of the Himalayan mountain chain. It has been suggested that the genus may have originated in this area and then spread westwards along the Himalayas and eastwards into the mountains of China and its southern neighbours. R. debilis falls into the area of distribution of the Chinese clade, although it was not included in the analysis by Ngamriabsakul et al.

== Distribution and habitat ==
Roscoea debilis occurs in Yunnan, China, growing at altitudes of 1,600–2,400 m (5,200–7,900 ft) in grassland.
