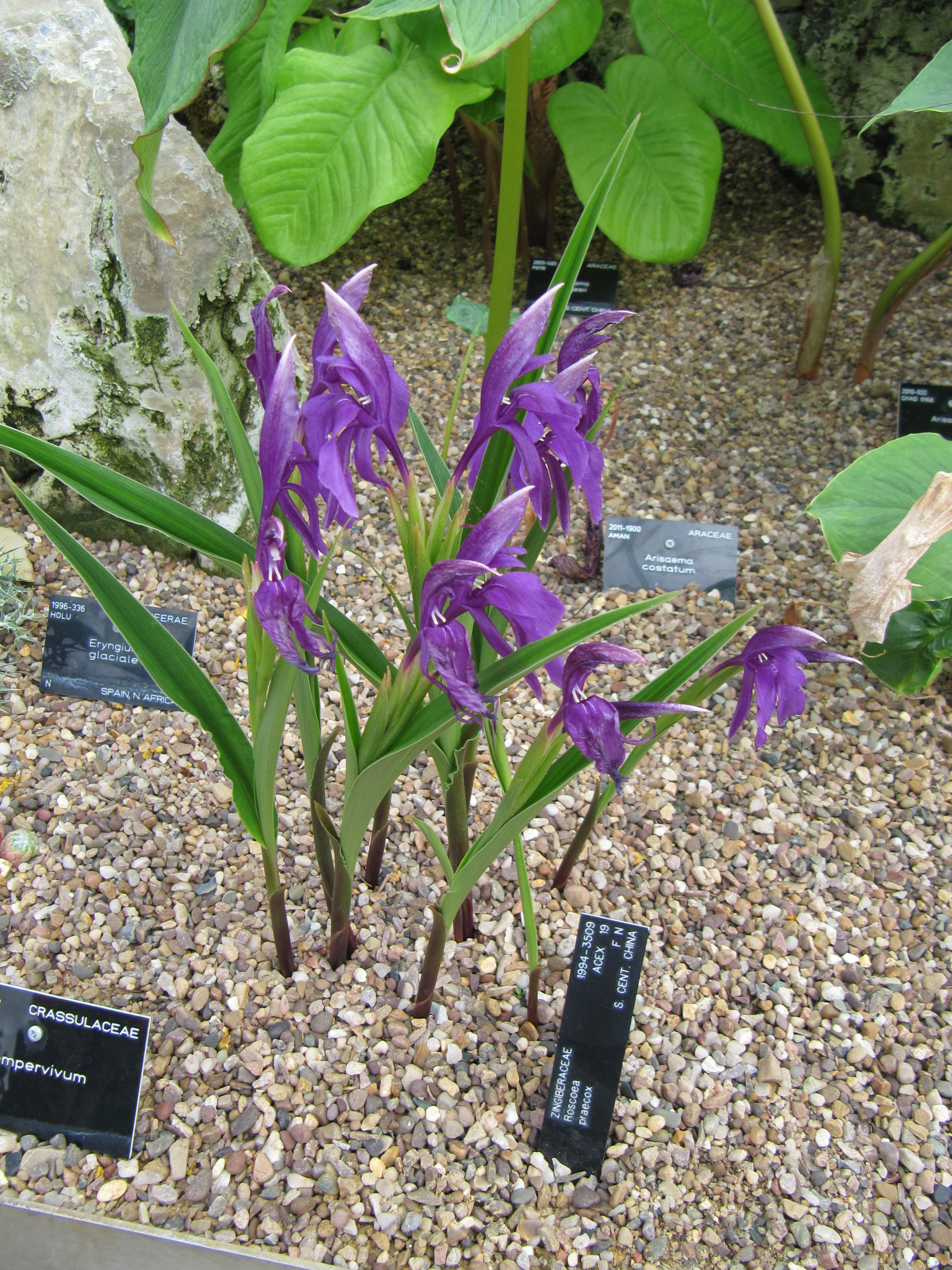
- At Kew Gardens

Scientific classification
- Kingdom: Plantae
- Clade: Tracheophytes
- Clade: Angiosperms
- Clade: Monocots
- Clade: Commelinids
- Order: Zingiberales
- Family: Zingiberaceae
- Genus: Roscoea
- Species: R. praecox

Binomial name
- Roscoea praecox K.Schum.

= Roscoea praecox =

Species of flowering plant

Roscoea praecox is a perennial herbaceous plant occurring in the Yunnan province of China. Most members of the ginger family (Zingiberaceae), to which it belongs, are tropical, but R. praecox, like other species of Roscoea, grows in much colder mountainous regions. It is sometimes grown as an ornamental plant in gardens.

== Description ==
Roscoea praecox is a perennial herbaceous plant. Like all members of the genus Roscoea, it dies back each year to a short vertical rhizome, to which are attached the tuberous roots. When growth begins again, "pseudostems" are produced: structures which resemble stems but are actually formed from the tightly wrapped bases (sheaths) of its leaves. In the case of R. praecox, the flowers appear before the leaves are fully grown. Plants are usually 7–30 cm tall. The first four or five leaves consist only of a sheath, which has brownish veins. The remaining leaves, which are not developed at flowering time, have a blade, with a very small ligule at the junction of the sheath and blade.

In its native habitats, R. praecox flowers between April and June. The stem (peduncle) of the flower spike may either be hidden by the leaf sheaths or protrude. One to three flowers open together and may be of various colours: purple, violet or white. The bracts which subtend the flowers are 4–6.5 cm long.

Each flower has the typical structure for Roscoea (see the diagrams in that article). There is a tube-shaped outer calyx, 3–4.5 cm long with a two-toothed apex. Next the three petals (the corolla) form a tube only just slightly protruding from the calyx, terminating in three more or less equally sized lobes, each around 3 cm long: an upright central lobe and two side lobes. Inside the petals are structures formed from four sterile stamens (staminodes): two lateral staminodes form what appear to be small upright petals, which are rhombic in shape with a narrower base, 1.7–2.5 cm long; two central staminodes are partially fused at the base to form a lip or labellum, 2.5–4 cm long by 1.5–2 cm wide. The labellum bends backwards and is split into two lobes for more than half its length. It has white markings at its narrowed base.

The single functional stamen has a cream anther with spurs about 7 mm long, formed from the connective tissue between the two capsules of the anther.

== Taxonomy ==
Roscoea praecox was first described scientifically by Karl Moritz Schumann, a German botanist, in 1904. The specific epithet praecox means "early". R. praecox flowers before the leaves have fully developed.

== Evolution and phylogeny ==
The family Zingiberaceae is mainly tropical in distribution. The unusual mountainous distribution of Roscoea may have evolved relatively recently and be a response to the uplift taking place in the region in the last 50 million years or so due to the collision of the Indian and Asian tectonic plates.

Species of Roscoea divide into two clear groups, a Himalayan clade and a "Chinese" clade (which includes some species from outside China). The two clades correspond to a geographical separation, their main distributions being divided by the Brahmaputra River as it flows south at the end of the Himalayan mountain chain. It has been suggested that the genus may have originated in this area and then spread westwards along the Himalayas and eastwards into the mountains of China and its southern neighbours. R. praecox falls into the Chinese clade as would be expected from its distribution. It is closely related to R. cautleyoides, R. humeana and R. wardii.

== Distribution and habitat ==
Roscoea praecox occurs in both shrubby and grassy habitats in mountains between 2,200 and 2,300 metres in the Yunnan province of China.

== Cultivation ==
Some Roscoea species and cultivars are grown in rock gardens. They generally require a relatively sunny position with moisture-retaining but well-drained soil. As they do not appear above ground until late spring or even early summer, they escape frost damage in regions where subzero temperatures occur. R. praecox has been grown at the Royal Botanic Gardens, Kew, where it flowered between May and July. It does not appear to be as widely cultivated as some other species (e.g. it was not included in the Pacific Bulb Society's information on the genus as of October 2011), but was part of a Royal Horticultural Society trial of Roscoea in 2007–2011.

For propagation, see Roscoea: Cultivation.

== Bibliography ==
- Cowley, Jill (1997), "Plate 307. Roscoea praecox", Curtis's Botanical Magazine, 14 (1): 2–6, doi:10.1111/1467-8748.00050
