= Elizabeth Jill Cowley =

British botanist

- Born: 1940
- Scientific career
- Fields: Botany, Horticulture
- Author abbrev. (botany): Cowley

Elizabeth Jill Cowley (born 1940) is a British botanist, who has worked at the Royal Botanic Gardens, Kew. Her interests have included the tropical flora of East Africa and the genus Roscoea.

After working at a nursery at Tadworth, Surrey, she took a horticultural course at Merrist Wood Farm Institute (1958), then worked at Elm Garden Nurseries, Claygate for eight years. She then worked in Geneva, Switzerland, and Millers of Send, near Guildford. She started working at Kew Gardens in 1968 in the Temperate House, Himalaya section. In 1972 she moved to work in the Herbarium, working on petaloid monocots, retiring in 2000. She took part in collecting trips to Korea, Turkey and China. She remained an Honorary Research Associate.

Born Elizabeth Jill Bedwell, she married Richard Cowley, a Kew student, in 1970.

== Some publications ==
=== Books ===
- Cowley, E.J. (1988), Burmanniaceae, Flora of Tropical East Africa, Rotterdam: A.A. Balkema, ISBN 978-90-6191-340-5
- Cowley, E.J. (1989), Smilacaceae, Flora of Tropical East Africa, Rotterdam: A.A. Balkema, ISBN 978-90-6191-347-4
- Cowley, Jill (2007), The genus Roscoea, Royal Botanic Gardens, Kew, ISBN 978-1-84246-134-1

=== Others ===
- Cowley, E.J. (1980), "A new species of Roscoea (Zingiberaceae) from Nepal", Kew Bulletin, 34 (4): 811–812, doi:10.2307/4119072, JSTOR 4119072
- Cowley, E.J. (1982), "A revision of Roscoea (Zingiberaceae)", Kew Bulletin, 36 (4): 747–777, doi:10.2307/4117918, JSTOR 4117918
- Cowley, E.J. (1983), "173. Marantacées", in Bosser, J.; Cadet, T.; Gueho, J.; et al. (eds.), Flore des Mascareignes : la Réunion, Maurice, Rodrigues 171. Zingiberacées à 176. Bromeliacées, Mauritius: Sugar Industry Research Institute, etc., OCLC 9896555
- Cowley, Jill & Wilford, Richard (1998), "Plate 349. Roscoea tumjensis", Curtis's Botanical Magazine, 15 (4): 220–225, doi:10.1111/1467-8748.00176
