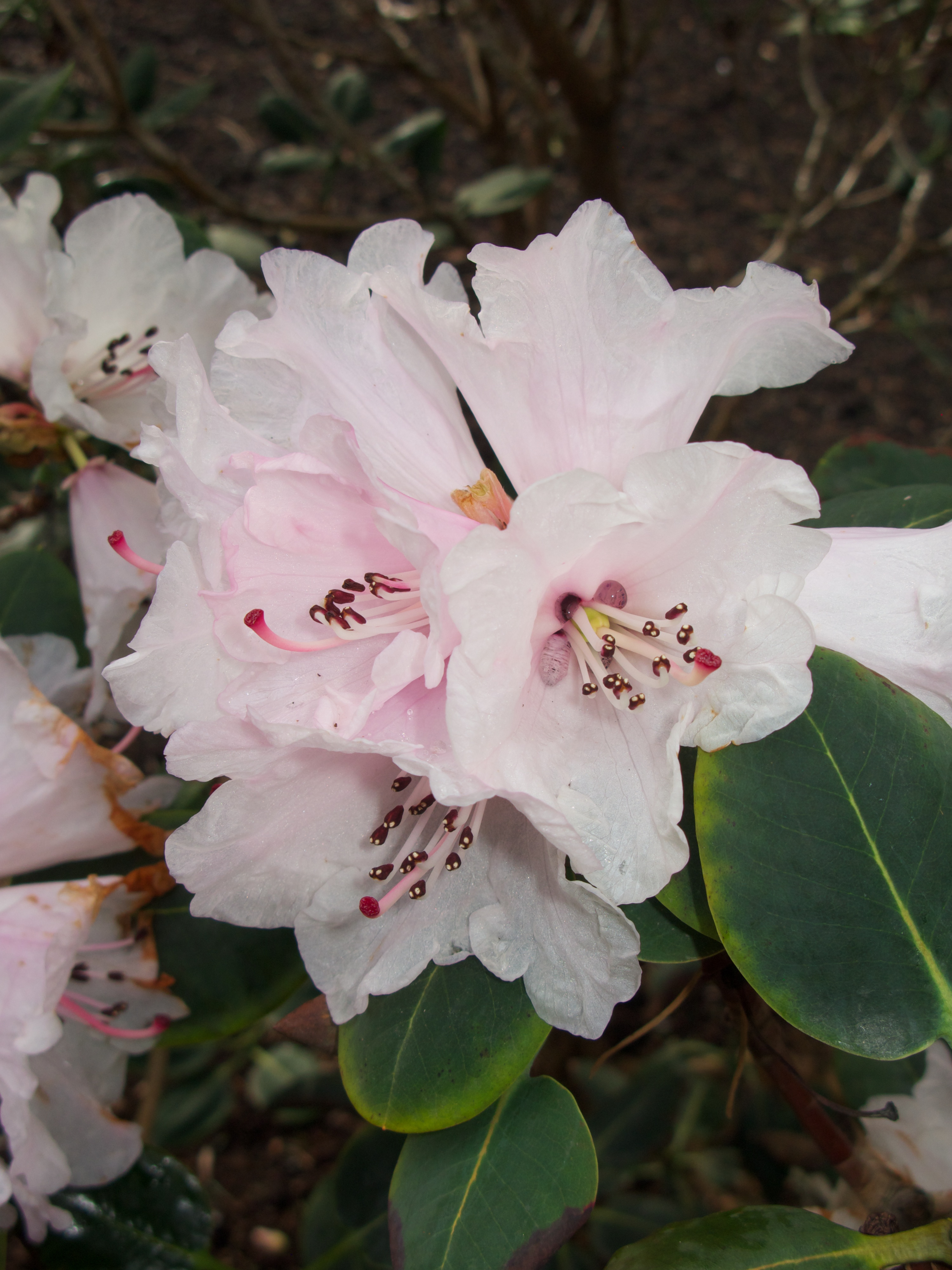
- In cultivation at Royal Botanic Garden Edinburgh Acc. No. 19910978C

Conservation status
- Vulnerable (IUCN 2.3)

Scientific classification
- Kingdom: Plantae
- Clade: Tracheophytes
- Clade: Angiosperms
- Clade: Eudicots
- Clade: Asterids
- Order: Ericales
- Family: Ericaceae
- Genus: Rhododendron
- Species: R. cyanocarpum

Binomial name
- Rhododendron cyanocarpum (Franchet) W.W.Sm.

= Rhododendron cyanocarpum =

Species of plant

Rhododendron cyanocarpum is an evergreen shrub or small tree with leathery leaves and fragrant white or pink tinged flowers that are bell or funnel shaped. It is endemic to China (Sichuan and Yunnan) where it grows at altitudes of 3,000–4,000 m (9,800–13,100 ft). It is threatened by habitat loss.

It was originally discovered by Père Jean Marie Delavay, but later introduced to western horticulture by the Scottish botanist George Forrest in 1902.
