= Carex ascotreta =

Scientific classification
- Kingdom: Plantae
- Clade: Tracheophytes
- Clade: Angiosperms
- Clade: Monocots
- Clade: Commelinids
- Order: Poales
- Family: Cyperaceae
- Genus: Carex
- Species: C. ascotreta

Binomial name
- Carex ascotreta C.B.Clarke ex. Franch., 1897

Synonyms
- Carex davidi var. ascocentra (C.B.Clarke ex Franch.) Kük.; Carex ichangensis C.B.Clarke

Species of sedge

Carex ascotreta is a tussock-forming perennial in the family Cyperaceae. It is native to eastern parts of the Asia.

== See also ==
- List of Carex species
