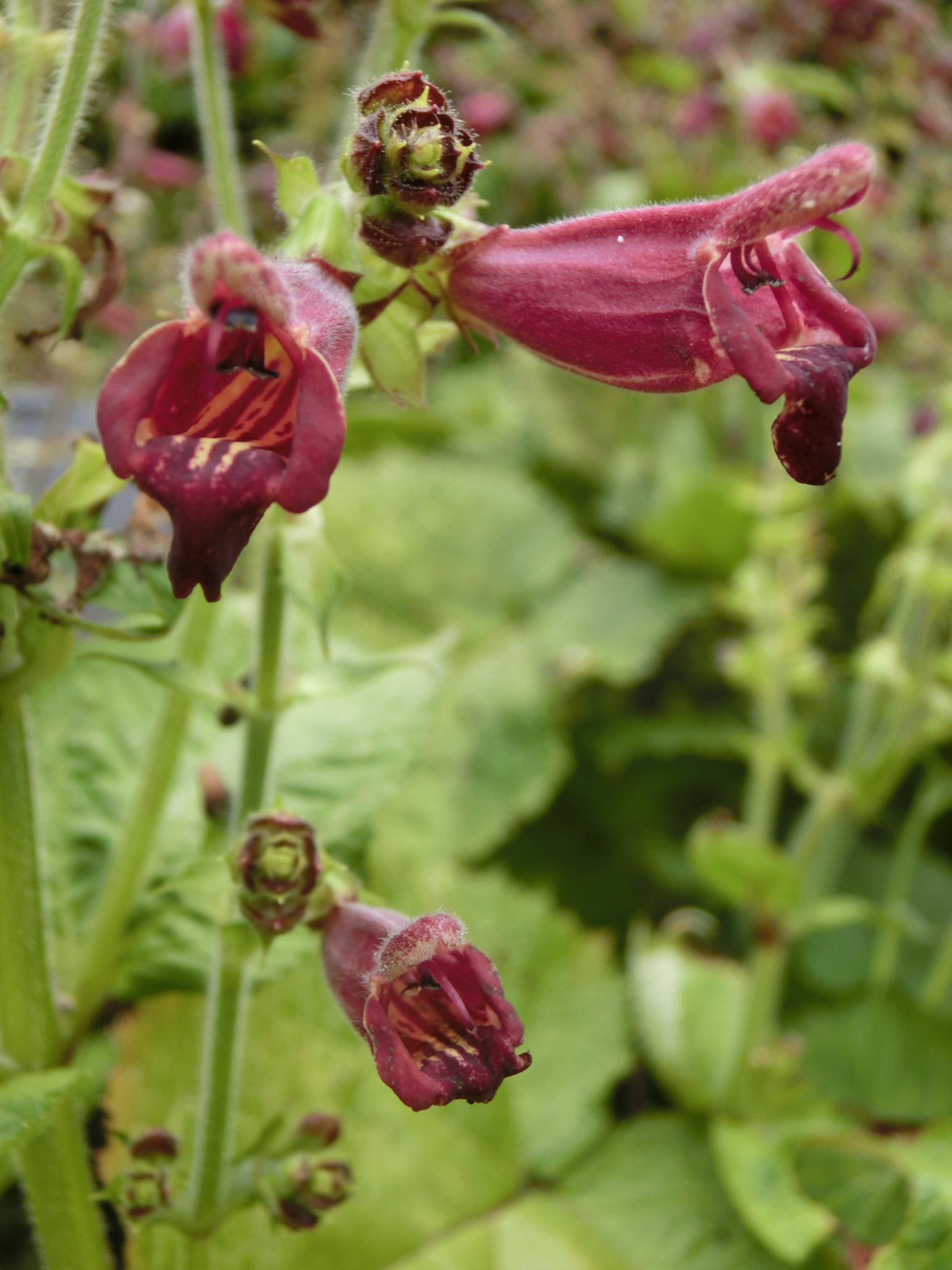
- Flowers of (Salvia brevilabra)

Scientific classification
- Kingdom: Plantae
- Clade: Tracheophytes
- Clade: Angiosperms
- Clade: Eudicots
- Clade: Asterids
- Order: Lamiales
- Family: Lamiaceae
- Genus: Salvia
- Species: S. brevilabra

Binomial name
- Salvia brevilabra Franch.

= Salvia brevilabra =

Species of flowering plant

Salvia brevilabra (the shortlip sage) is a perennial plant that is native to Sichuan province in China, growing on hillsides, grasslands, and in forests at 3,200 to 3,800 m (10,500 to 12,500 ft) elevation. It grows up to 60 cm (24 in) tall, with basal leaves that are ovate to triangular-ovate, 9 to 11 cm (3.5 to 4.3 in) long and 5 to 7 cm (2.0 to 2.8 in) wide. The stem leaves are somewhat smaller, and more triangular in shape.

Inflorescences are racemes or panicles, approximately 13 cm (5.1 in), with a blue-purple corolla about 2.5 cm (0.98 in) long.
