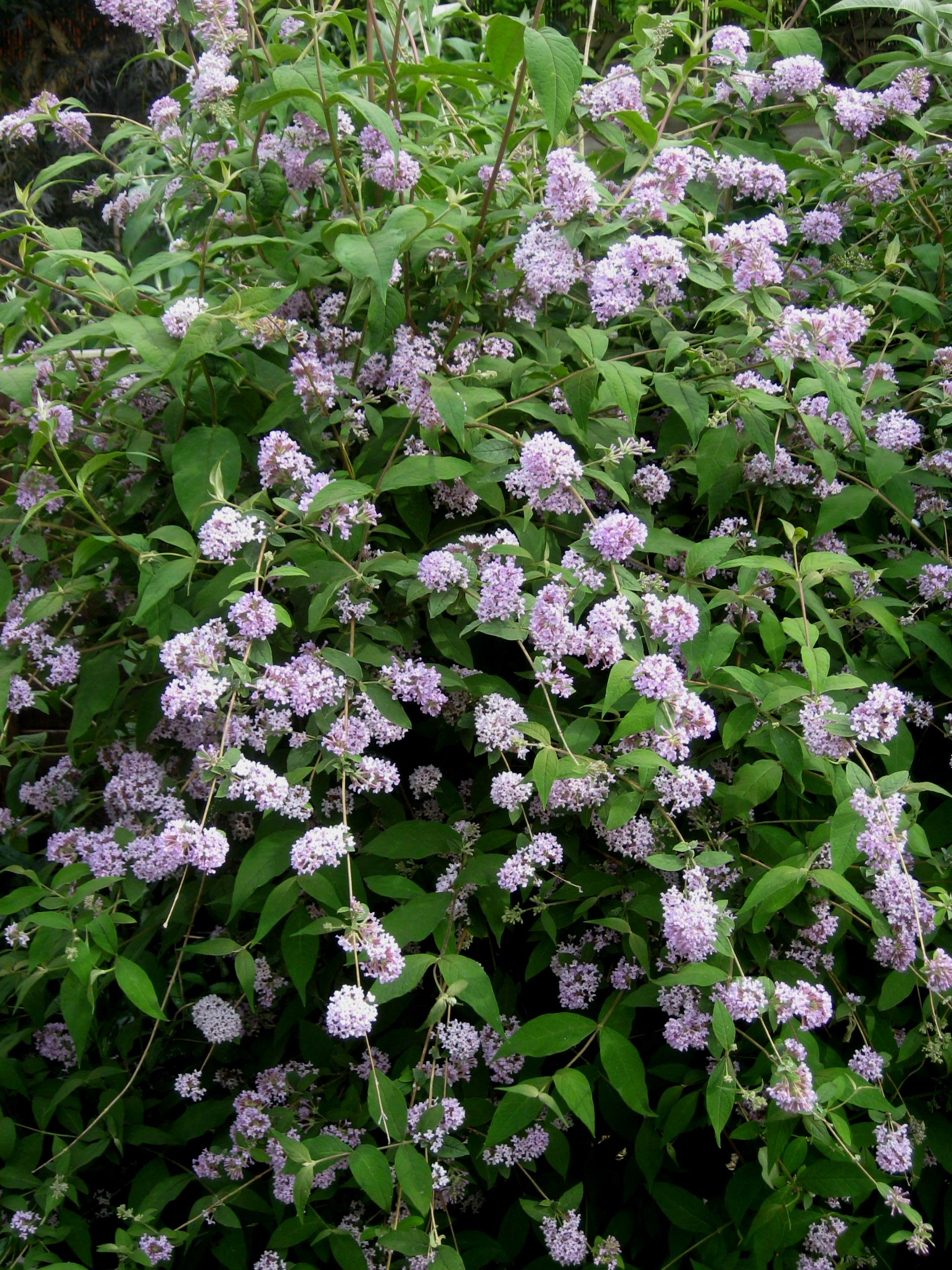
- Buddleja delavayi in May, Portchester, England.

Scientific classification
- Kingdom: Plantae
- Clade: Tracheophytes
- Clade: Angiosperms
- Clade: Eudicots
- Clade: Asterids
- Order: Lamiales
- Family: Scrophulariaceae
- Genus: Buddleja
- Species: B. delavayi

Binomial name
- Buddleja delavayi Gagnep.

Synonyms
- Buddleja delayai var. tomentosa Comber; Buddleja glabrescens W. W. Sm.; Buddleja heliophila W. W. Sm.; Buddleja heliophila var. adenophora Hand.-Mazz.; Buddleja heliophila var. angustifolia Marquand; Buddleja heliophila var. pubescens Marquand

= Buddleja delavayi =

Species of plant

Buddleja delavayi is a Chinese species discovered by Forrest in the Tali Range above Dali (2000 – 2500 m elevation), Yunnan, in 1910; it is also found in Xizang (Tibet). The species was named for l'Abbé Delavay, the French missionary and plant collector, by Gagnepain in 1912. The shrub is of interest to the botanist because of its unique (within the genus) resting buds and the different types of inflorescence produced through the year.

== Description ==
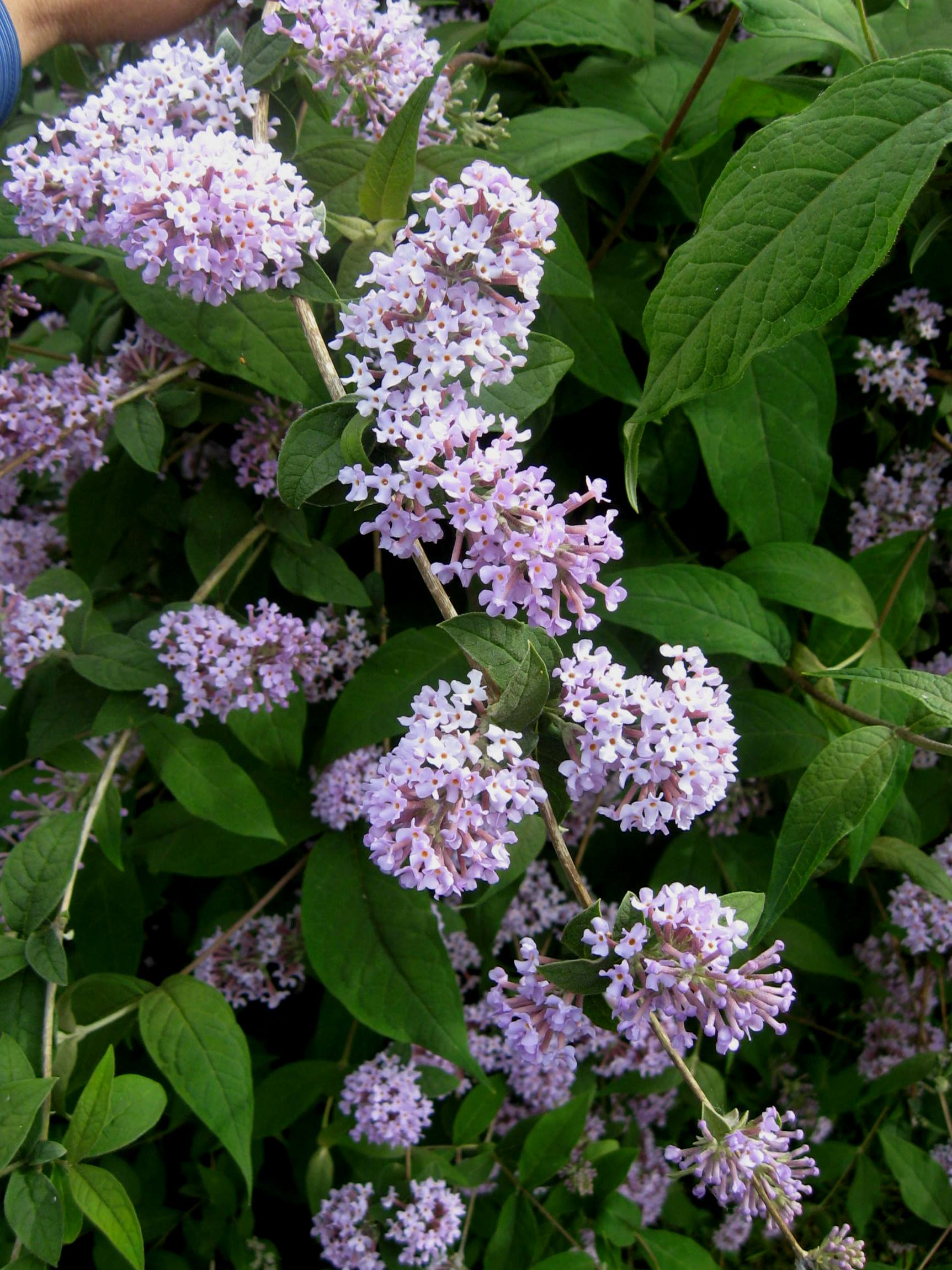
B. delavayi spring inflorescence

Buddleja delavayi is a deciduous shrub or small tree growing 2 – 6 m high by up to 3 m wide. The young branches and shoots are rounded, bearing elliptic leaves 1.5 – 6 cm long, usually with short < 4 mm petioles, the margins either serrate or entire. The heavily honey-scented flowers, which appear in April and occasionally again in September, are rose-lilac with an orange eye, borne in lax, terminal and axillary panicles. The inflorescences produced in spring are small, 4 – 12 cm long, whereas those produced in autumn are more than twice the length, at 20 – 25 cm. The individual flowers are relatively large, the corollas 8 mm wide by 10 mm long, and a deep salmon rose in colour. The buds of the spring flowers are formed in autumn, and protected from frost by small dry brown scales resembling those of the cherry, and are unique within the genus. Ploidy 2n = 114.

== Cultivation ==
Introduced to the UK at about the time of the First World War, B. delavayi was raised at Caerhays Castle by J. C. Williams, and later at Kew. The shrub is included in the NCCPG National Collection held by the Longstock Park Nursery, near Stockbridge, Hampshire. Hardiness: USDA zones 8 – 9.

== Literature ==
- Bean, W. J. (1970). Trees & Shrubs Hardy in the British Isles, 8th ed., Vol. 1.. (2nd impression 1976) London
- Hillier & Sons (1990). Hillier's Manual of Trees & Shrubs, 5th ed.. David & Charles, Newton Abbot.
- Krüssmann, G. (1984). Manual of Cultivated Broad-leaved Trees & Shrubs, Vol. 1. Engl. transl. London, 1984.
- Leeuwenberg, A. J. M. (1979) The Loganiaceae of Africa XVIII Buddleja L. II, Revision of the African & Asiatic species. H. Veenman & Zonen, Wageningen, Nederland.
- Li, P. T. & Leeuwenberg, A. J. M. (1996). Loganiaceae, in Wu, Z. & Raven, P. (eds) Flora of China, Vol. 15. Science Press, Beijing, and Missouri Botanical Garden Press, St. Louis, USA. ISBN 978-0915279371 online at www.efloras.org
- Phillips, R. & Rix, M. (1989). Shrubs, Pan Books, London.
