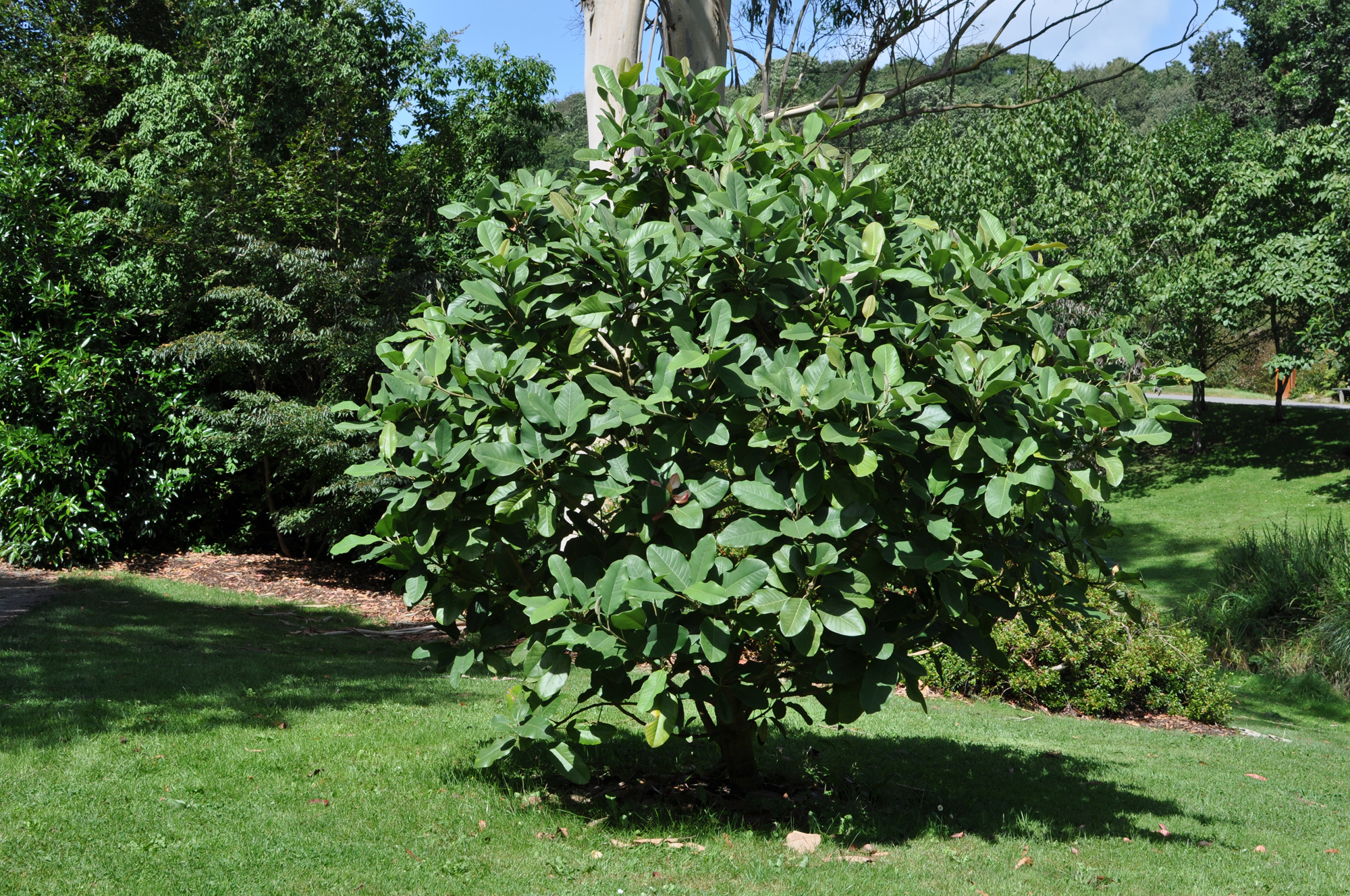

Conservation status
- Least Concern (IUCN 3.1)

Scientific classification
- Kingdom: Plantae
- Clade: Embryophytes
- Clade: Tracheophytes
- Clade: Spermatophytes
- Clade: Angiosperms
- Clade: Magnoliids
- Order: Magnoliales
- Family: Magnoliaceae
- Genus: Magnolia
- Subgenus: Magnolia subg. Magnolia
- Section: Magnolia sect. Gwillimia
- Subsection: Magnolia subsect. Gwillimia
- Species: M. delavayi

Binomial name
- Magnolia delavayi Franch.

Synonyms
- Lirianthe delavayi (Franch.) N.H.Xia & C.Y.Wu; Magnolia carpunii Romanov & A.V.Bobrov

= Magnolia delavayi =

Chinese evergreen magnolia

Species of tree

Magnolia delavayi is a species of flowering plant in the genus Magnolia. It is known by the common names of Chinese evergreen magnolia or Delavay's magnolia. It was named after Father Delavay, French Catholic missionary in China, who collected it.

== Description ==
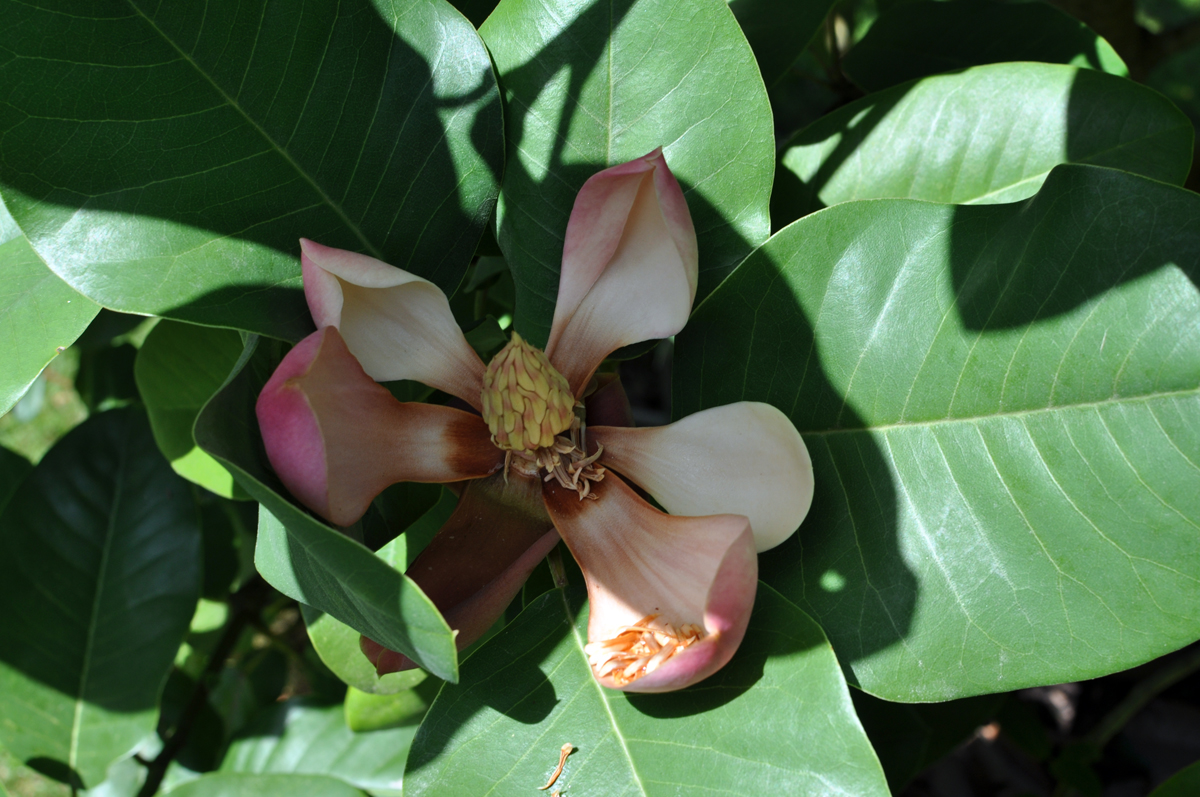
Magnolia delavayi's flower

Magnolia delavayi is a small evergreen tree 8–15 metres (26–49 ft) in height with gray to grayish-black bark. The leaves are ovate to ovate-oblong, 10–20 cm (rarely to 32 cm) long and 5–10 cm (rarely to 20 cm) broad, tough, leathery, with a 5–7 cm petiole.

The flowers are fragrant, cup-shaped, 15–25 cm broad, with nine thick, creamy white to pink tepals; stamens ca. 210 and ovoid gynoecium with ca. 100 carpels.

== Distribution and habitat ==
Magnolia delavayi is native to southern China, occurring in Guizhou, Sichuan and Yunnan at 1,500-2,800 m of elevation.

== Ecology ==
In its native habitat, flowering occurs from April to June. It grows on wet slopes on limestone areas.

== Cultivation ==
Magnolia delavayi is grown as an ornamental tree for its evergreen foliage as well as flowers. It is uncommon though increasing in cultivation elsewhere, such as in California. A recently selected red-flowered form is becoming popular in cultivation.

Magnolia delavayi is the city tree of Chongqing.
