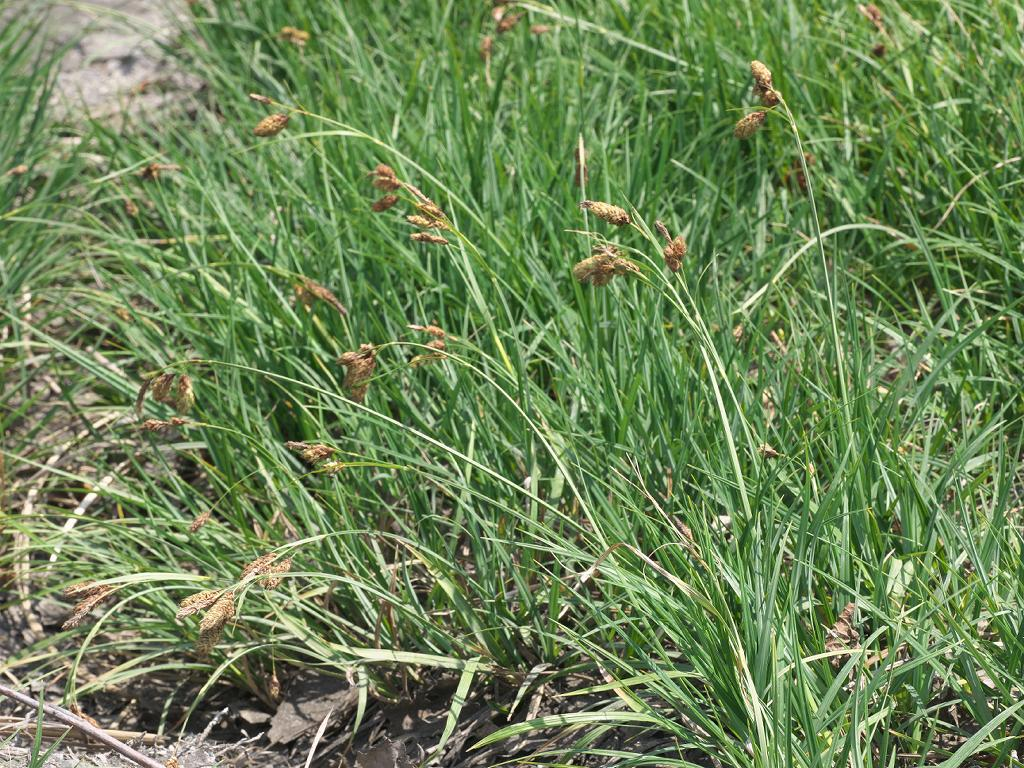

Scientific classification
- Kingdom: Plantae
- Clade: Tracheophytes
- Clade: Angiosperms
- Clade: Monocots
- Clade: Commelinids
- Order: Poales
- Family: Cyperaceae
- Genus: Carex
- Species: C. angustisquama

Binomial name
- Carex angustisquama Franch.

= Carex angustisquama =

Species of plant

Carex angustisquama is a tussock-forming species of perennial sedge in the family Cyperaceae. It is native to northern parts of Honshu in Japan.

The plant was first formally described by the botanist Adrien René Franchet in 1895 as a part of the work Bulletin de la Société Philomatique de Paris.

== See also ==
- List of Carex species
