= Carex cylindrostachys =

Scientific classification
- Kingdom: Plantae
- Clade: Tracheophytes
- Clade: Angiosperms
- Clade: Monocots
- Clade: Commelinids
- Order: Poales
- Family: Cyperaceae
- Genus: Carex
- Species: C. cylindrostachys

Binomial name
- Carex cylindrostachys Franch.

Species of plant

Carex cylindrostachys is a tussock-forming species of perennial sedge in the family Cyperaceae. It is native to parts of Yunnan and Sichuan in China. Its common name in Chinese is Chinese: 柱穗薹草; pinyin: zhù suì tái cǎo.

The plant was first formally described by the botanist Adrien René Franchet in 1895 as a part of the work Bulletin de la Société Philomatique de Paris.

== See also ==
- List of Carex species
