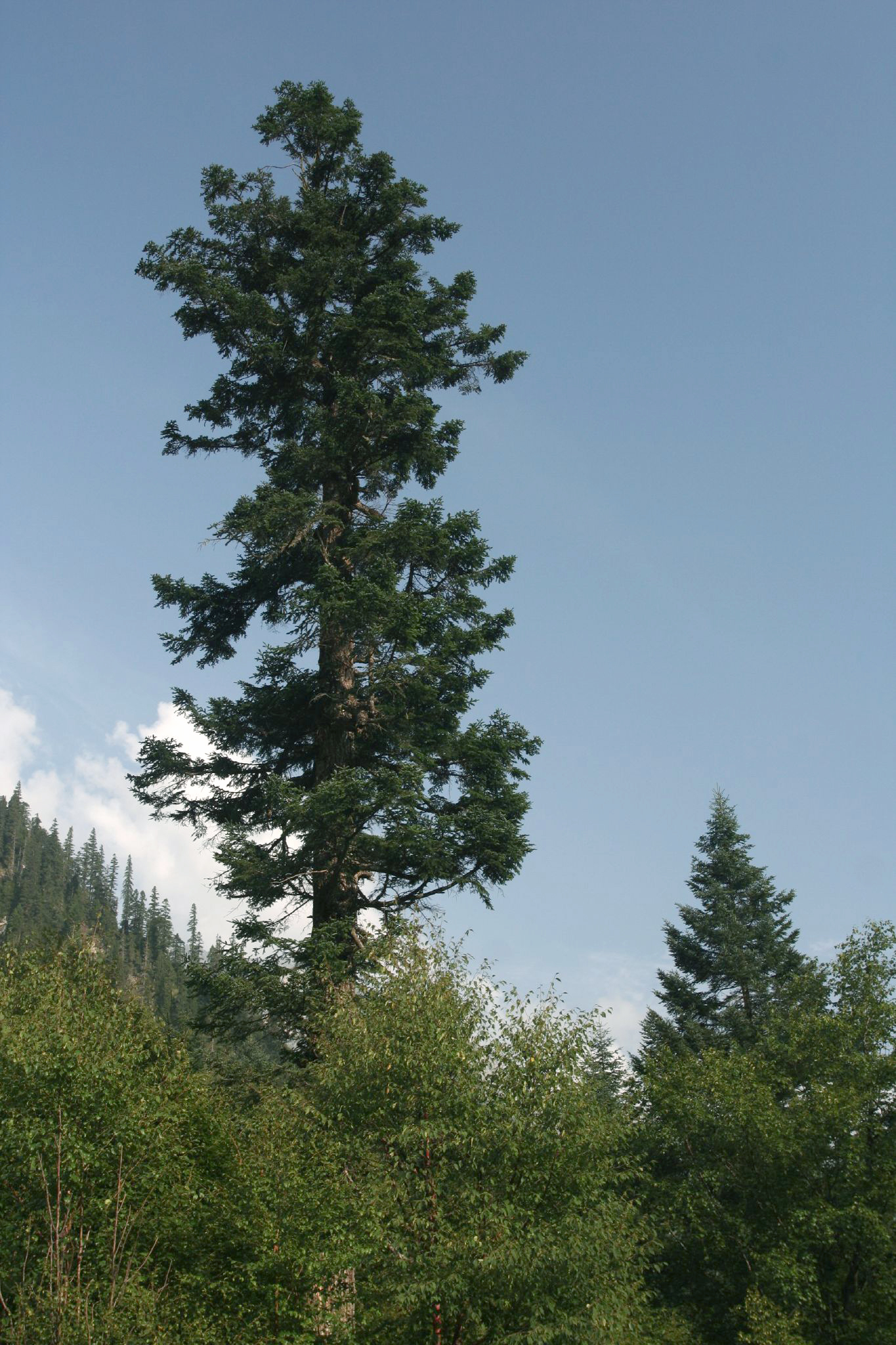

Conservation status
- Least Concern (IUCN 3.1)

Scientific classification
- Kingdom: Plantae
- Clade: Tracheophytes
- Clade: Gymnospermae
- Division: Pinophyta
- Class: Pinopsida
- Order: Pinales
- Family: Pinaceae
- Genus: Abies
- Species: A. fargesii

Binomial name
- Abies fargesii Franch.

Synonyms
- Abies faxoniana Rehder & E.H.Wilson; Abies kansouensis Bordères & Gaussen; Abies sutchueennsis (Franch.) Rehder & E.H.Wilson

= Abies fargesii =

Species of conifer

Abies fargesii (Chinese: 巴山冷杉) is a species of fir, a coniferous tree in the family Pinaceae. Its common name is Farges' fir, after the French missionary, botanist and plant collector, Paul Guillaume Farges. Abies fargesii can grow very large and be up to 40 metres (130 ft) tall. It is endemic to central China where it is found in Gansu, Henan, Hubei, Shaanxi, and Sichuan provinces. It grows in mountains and river basins at altitudes between 1,500–3,900 metres (4,900–12,800 ft) ASL. The cones of the given fir are 0.8 to 1.5 by 1.3–2 centimetres (0.51–0.79 in).

Abies fargesii is a timber tree used in construction and for pulp.

The Latin specific epithet fargesii refers to the French missionary and amateur botanist Père Paul Guillaume Farges (1844–1912).

Varieties:

- Abies fargesii var. sutchuenensis Franch. (synonym: Abies sutchuenensis (Franch.) Rehder & E.H.Wilson)

== Gallery ==
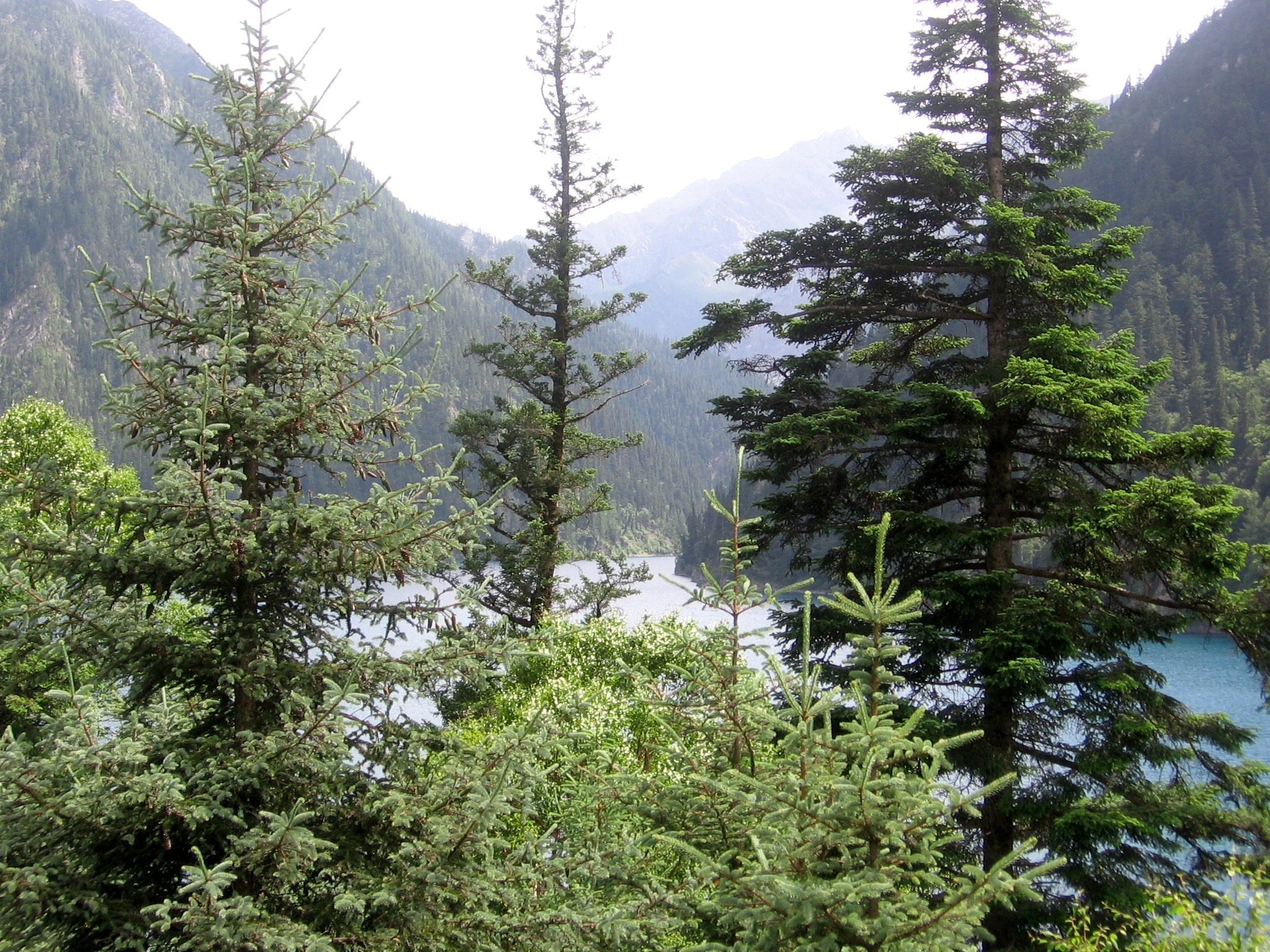
Picea asperata (left) and A. fargesii (right), Jiuzhaigou Valley, Sichuan, China

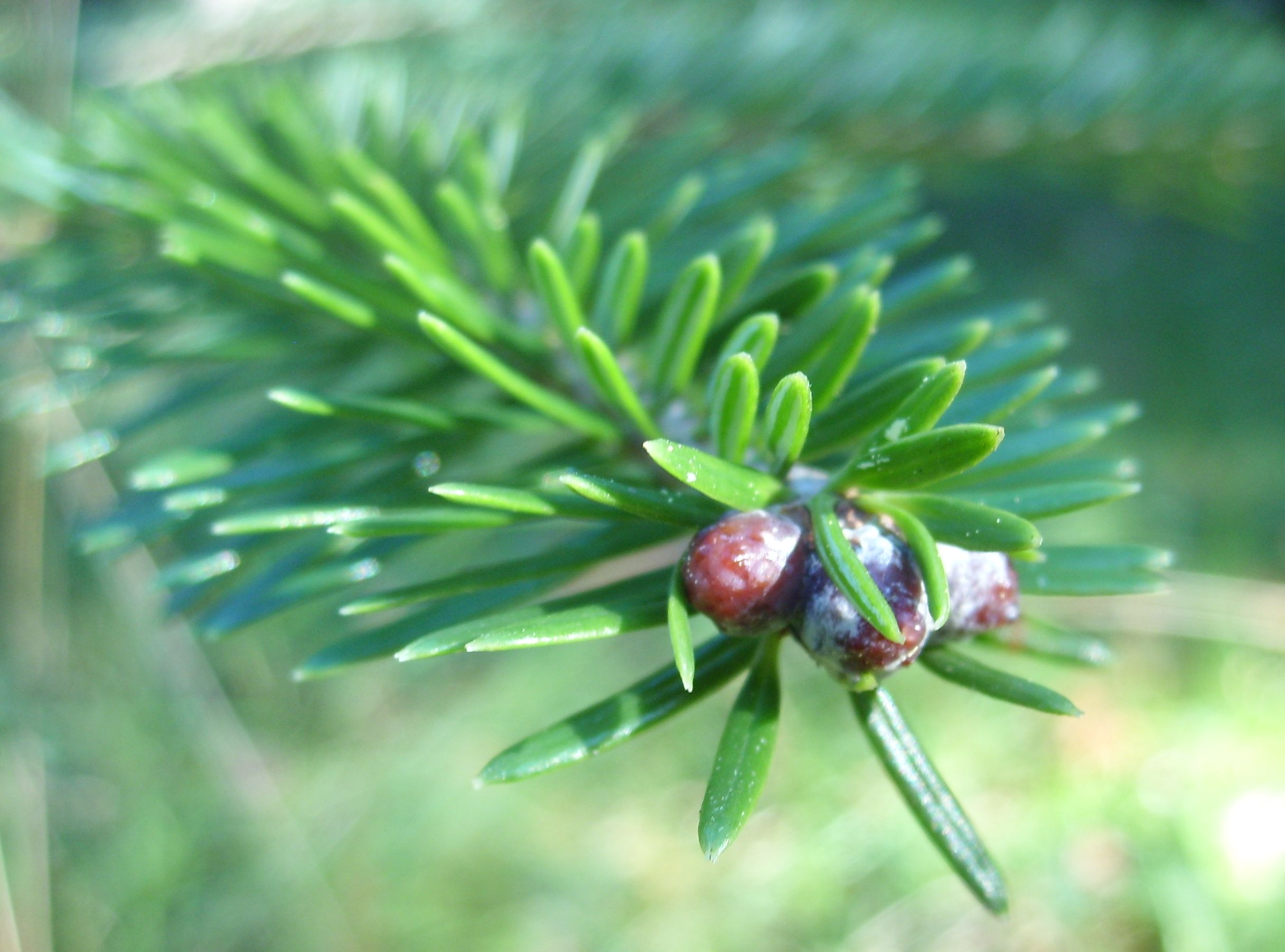
Buds and foliage of A. fargesii var. faxoniana
