= Carex bodinieri =

Scientific classification
- Kingdom: Plantae
- Clade: Tracheophytes
- Clade: Angiosperms
- Clade: Monocots
- Clade: Commelinids
- Order: Poales
- Family: Cyperaceae
- Genus: Carex
- Species: C. bodinieri

Binomial name
- Carex bodinieri Franch.

Species of plant

Carex bodinieri is a tussock-forming species of perennial sedge in the family Cyperaceae. It is native to Japan and eastern parts of China.

The plant was first formally described by the botanist Adrien René Franchet in 1895 as a part of the work Bulletin de la Société Philomatique de Paris.

== See also ==
- List of Carex species
