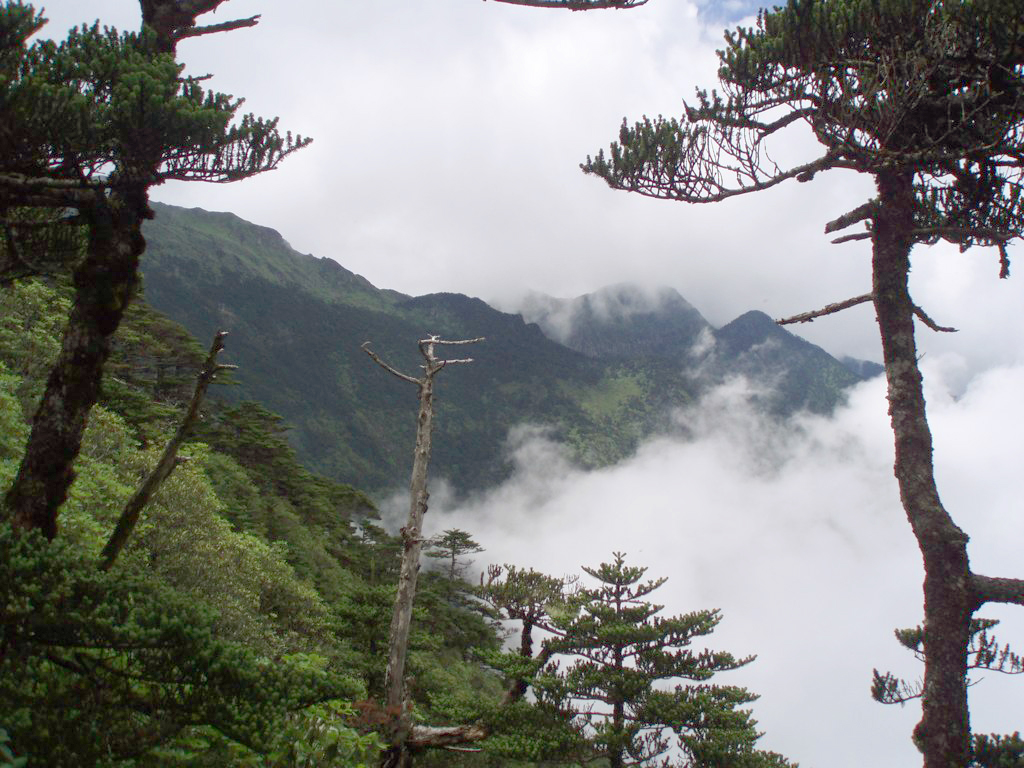

Conservation status
- Least Concern (IUCN 3.1)

Scientific classification
- Kingdom: Plantae
- Clade: Embryophytes
- Clade: Tracheophytes
- Clade: Spermatophytes
- Clade: Gymnosperms
- Division: Pinophyta
- Class: Pinopsida
- Order: Pinales
- Family: Pinaceae
- Genus: Abies
- Section: Abies sect. Pseudopicea
- Species: A. delavayi

Binomial name
- Abies delavayi Franch.

Subspecies and varieties
- Abies delavayi subsp. delavayi; Abies delavayi var. fabri (Mast.) D.R.Hunt; Abies delavayi subsp. fansipanensis (Q.P.Xiang, L.K.Fu & Nan Li) Rushforth; Abies delavayi var. motuoensis W.C.Cheng & L.K.Fu; Abies delavayi var. nukiangensis (W.C.Cheng & L.K.Fu) Farjon & Silba

= Abies delavayi =

Species of conifer

Abies delavayi, the Delavay's silver-fir or Delavay's fir, is a species of fir, native to Yunnan in southwest China and adjoining border areas in southeastern Tibet, far northeastern India, northern Myanmar, and far northwestern Vietnam. It is a high altitude mountain tree, growing at elevations of 3,000–4,000 m (exceptionally down to 2,400 m and up to 4,300 m), often occupying the tree line.

The species is named after its discoverer, Father Pierre Jean Marie Delavay, who collected it at 3,500–4,000 m on the Cang Mountain near Dali.

It is a small to medium-sized evergreen tree growing to 7–40 m tall, often less at tree line. The shoots are purple-brown to dark red-brown, glabrous or finely pubescent. The leaves are needle-like, 15–30 mm long and 1–2 mm broad, with a distinctive revolute margin. The upper surface of the leaves is glossy dark green with no stomata, the underside vivid snow-white with the stomata densely covered in white wax; this is thought to be an adaptation to exclude very heavy rain in its monsoon climate. The cones are dark purple-blue, 6–12 cm long and 3–4.5 cm broad, with numerous small scales and exserted bracts; they break up when mature at 6–8 months old to release the winged seeds.

Trees at lower elevation (2,400–3,000 m) differ in having the leaf margin less revolute, and are separated as a variety Abies delavayi var. nukiangensis (Cheng & Fu) Farjon.

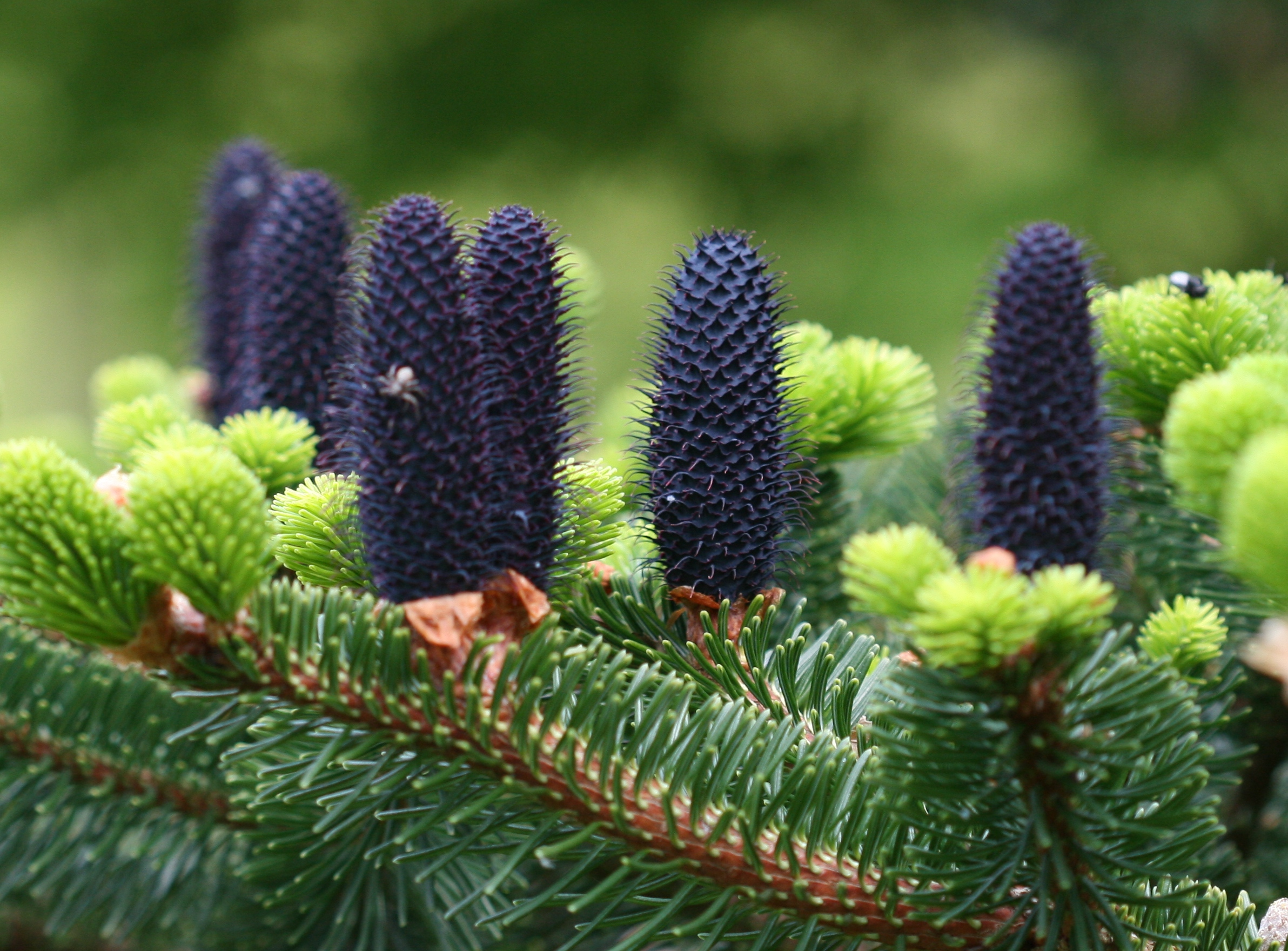
Delavay's fir in the Royal Botanic Garden, Edinburgh, Scotland

Plants in southeastern Tibet have been distinguished as Abies delavayi var. motuoensis Cheng & Fu, differing in paler, densely pubescent shoots.

The Vietnamese population, with a disjunct range on Fansipan (at 3,143 m the highest mountain in Vietnam), is distinct in paler red-brown shoots and the cones having shorter bracts (not exserted), and is separated as a subspecies Abies delavayi subsp. fansipanensis (Q.P.Xiang) Rushforth (syn. Abies fansipanensis Q.P.Xiang).

Delavay's fir is occasionally grown as an ornamental tree, but its successful cultivation is limited to regions with cool summers and high rainfall, such as western Scotland and the Pacific coast of Canada. A semi-dwarf form originating at very high altitude has been selected as a cultivar 'Major Neishe', growing to 3–4 m tall.
