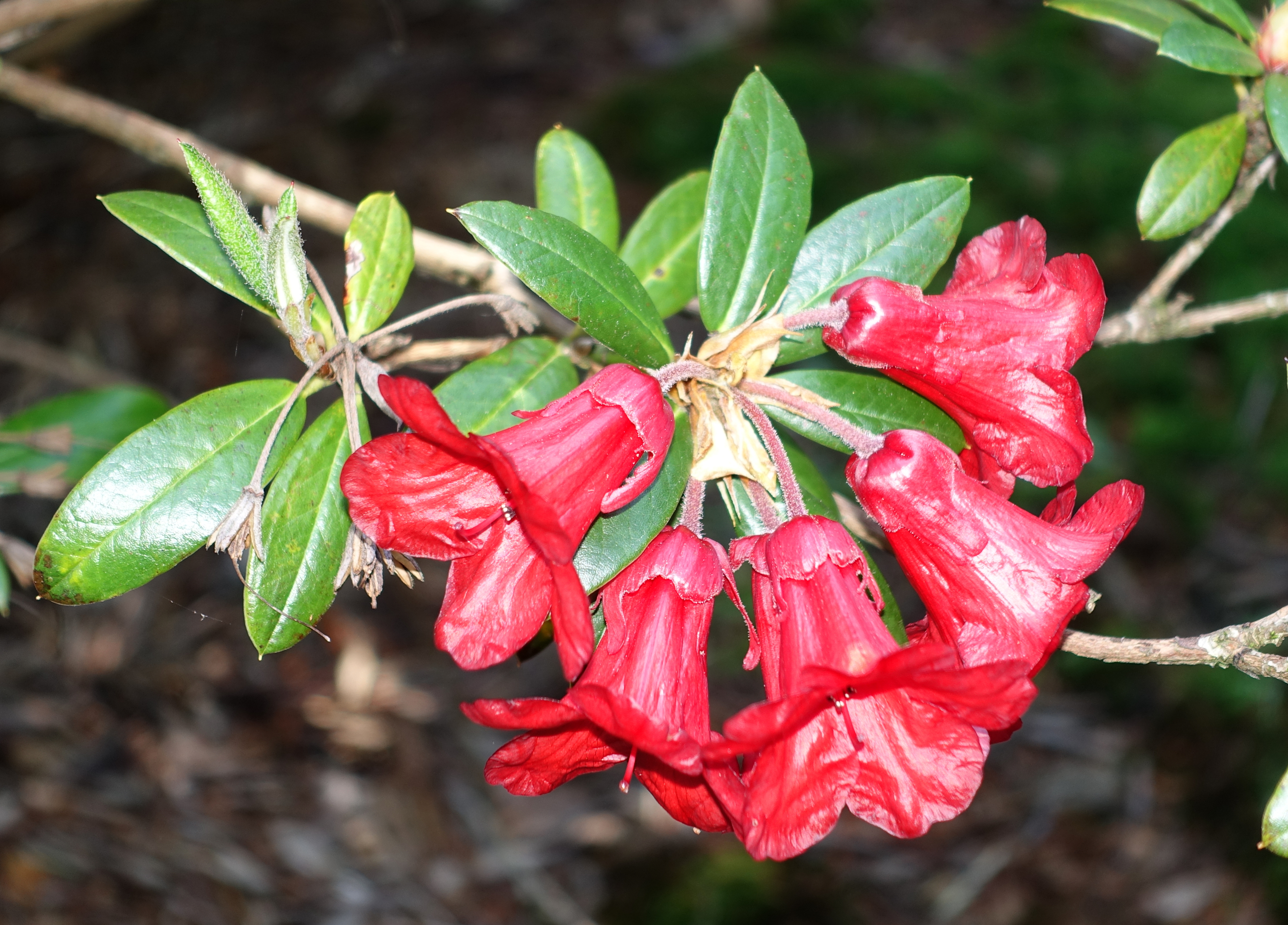

Scientific classification
- Kingdom: Plantae
- Clade: Tracheophytes
- Clade: Angiosperms
- Clade: Eudicots
- Clade: Asterids
- Order: Ericales
- Family: Ericaceae
- Genus: Rhododendron
- Species: R. sanguineum

Binomial name
- Rhododendron sanguineum Franch.

= Rhododendron sanguineum =

Species of plant

Rhododendron sanguineum (血红杜鹃) is a rhododendron species native to southeast Xizang and northwest Yunnan, China, where it grows at altitudes of 2,800–4,300 m (9,200–14,100 ft). It is a dwarf shrub that typically grows to 30–150 cm (12–59 in) in height, with leathery leaves that are obovate, widely elliptic to narrowly oblong in shape, and 3.8–8 × 1.8–3 cm in size. Flowers are red.

== Synonyms ==
- Rhododendron sanguineum subsp. sanguineoides Cowan
- Rhododendron sanguineum var. sanguineoides (Cowan) Davidian
- Rhododendron sanguineum subsp. sanguineum
- Rhododendron sanguineum var. sanguineum
