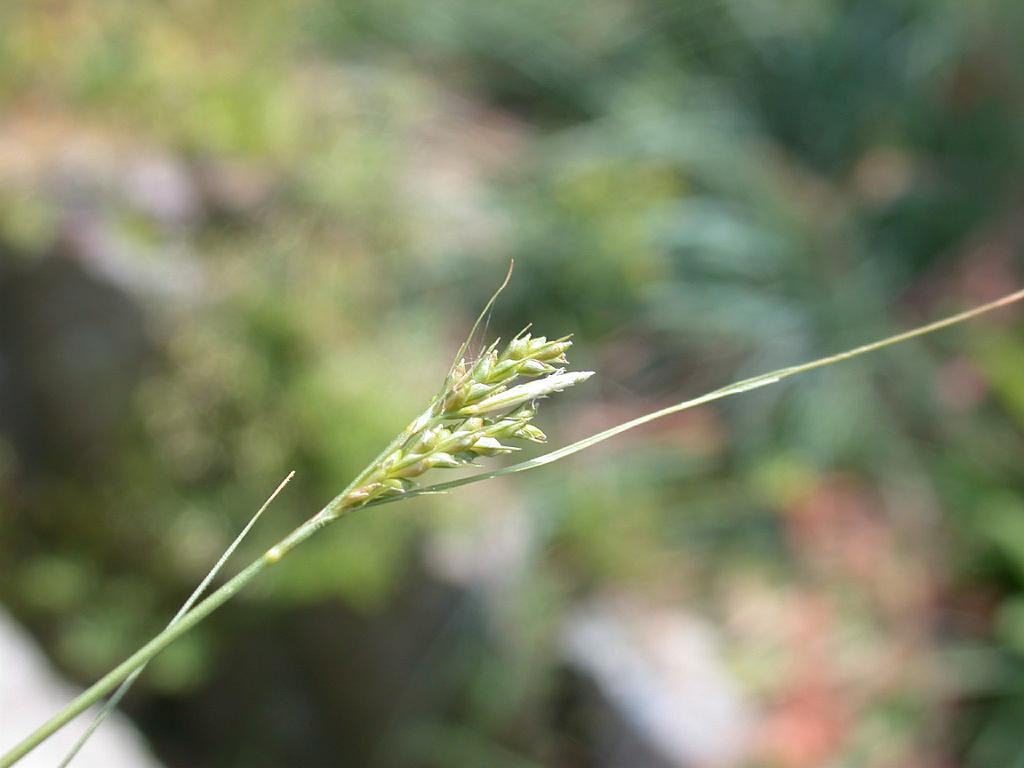

Scientific classification
- Kingdom: Plantae
- Clade: Tracheophytes
- Clade: Angiosperms
- Clade: Monocots
- Clade: Commelinids
- Order: Poales
- Family: Cyperaceae
- Genus: Carex
- Species: C. mitrata

Binomial name
- Carex mitrata Franch.

= Carex mitrata =

Species of plant

Carex mitrata, also known as mitra sedge is a tussock-forming species of perennial sedge in the family Cyperaceae. It is native to Japan, Korea, Taiwan and eastern parts of China.

The species was first formally described by the botanist Adrien René Franchet in 1895 as a part of the work Bulletin de la Société Philomatique de Paris. The type specimen was collected by Urbain Faurie in 1892 from the Shidzuoka mountains in 1892.

== See also ==
- List of Carex species
