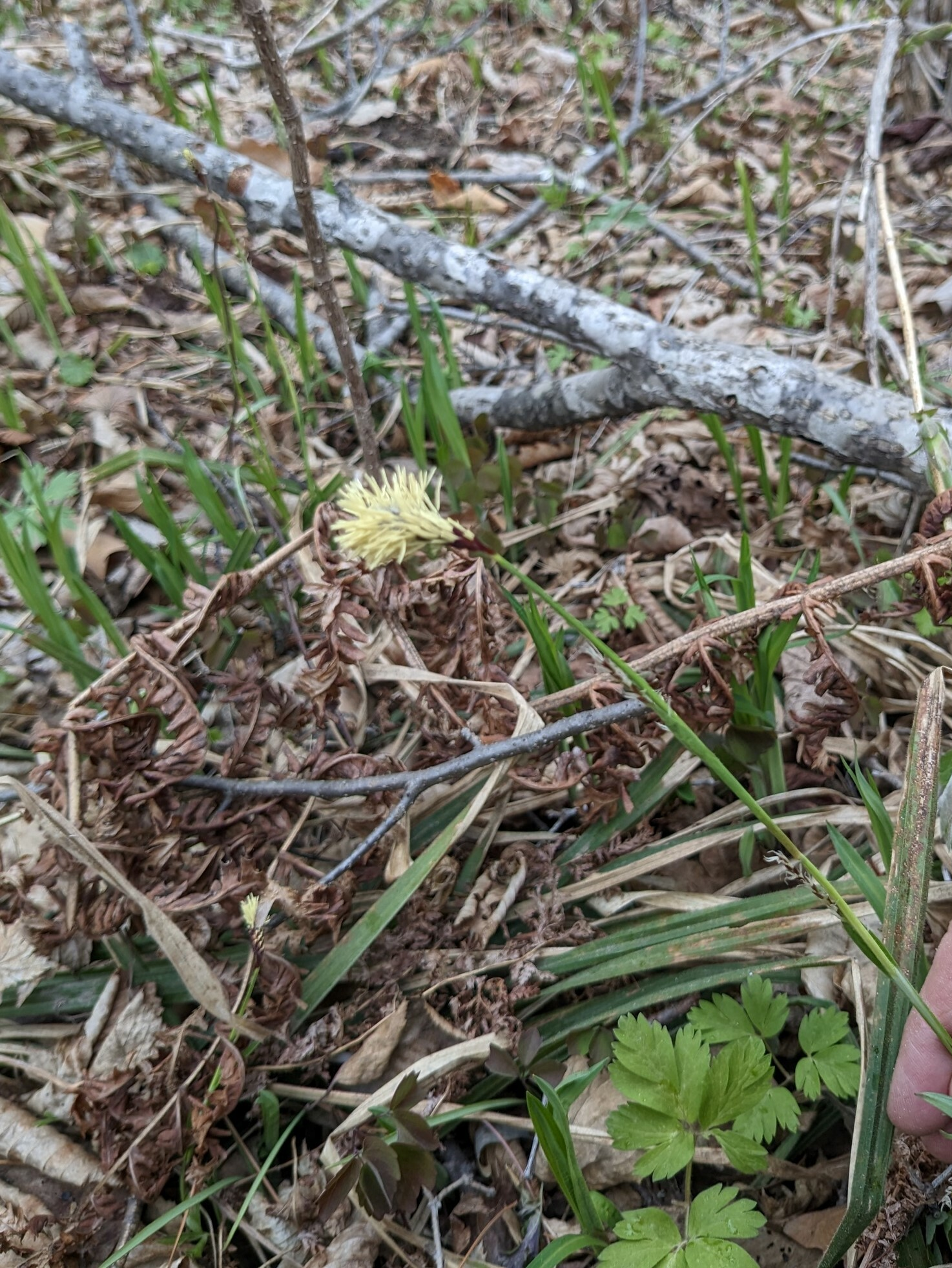

Scientific classification
- Kingdom: Plantae
- Clade: Tracheophytes
- Clade: Angiosperms
- Clade: Monocots
- Clade: Commelinids
- Order: Poales
- Family: Cyperaceae
- Genus: Carex
- Species: C. auriculata

Binomial name
- Carex auriculata Franch.

Synonyms
- Carex pilosa var. auriculata (Franch.) Kük.; Carex campylorhina V.I.Krecz.; Carex hakodatensis H.Lév. & Vaniot; Carex pilosa f. gracilior Meinsh.

= Carex auriculata =

Species of plant

Carex auriculata is a tussock-forming species of perennial sedge in the family Cyperaceae. It is native to eastern parts of Asia from Siberia in the north to Japan and Korea in the south.

== See also ==
- List of Carex species
