= Carex capilliformis =

Scientific classification
- Kingdom: Plantae
- Clade: Tracheophytes
- Clade: Angiosperms
- Clade: Monocots
- Clade: Commelinids
- Order: Poales
- Family: Cyperaceae
- Genus: Carex
- Species: C. capilliformis

Binomial name
- Carex capilliformis Franch.

Species of plant

Carex capilliformis is a tussock-forming species of perennial sedge in the family Cyperaceae. It is native to central parts of China.

The plant was first formally described by the botanist Adrien René Franchet in 1895 as a part of the work Bulletin de la Société Philomatique de Paris.

== See also ==
- List of Carex species
