= Carex davidi =

Scientific classification
- Kingdom: Plantae
- Clade: Tracheophytes
- Clade: Angiosperms
- Clade: Monocots
- Clade: Commelinids
- Order: Poales
- Family: Cyperaceae
- Genus: Carex
- Species: C. davidi

Binomial name
- Carex davidi Franch.

Species of plant

Carex davidi is a tussock-forming species of perennial sedge in the family Cyperaceae. It is native to parts of China.

The plant was first formally described by the botanist Adrien René Franchet in 1884, as a part of the work Plantae Davidianae ex Sinarum Imperio.

== See also ==
- List of Carex species
