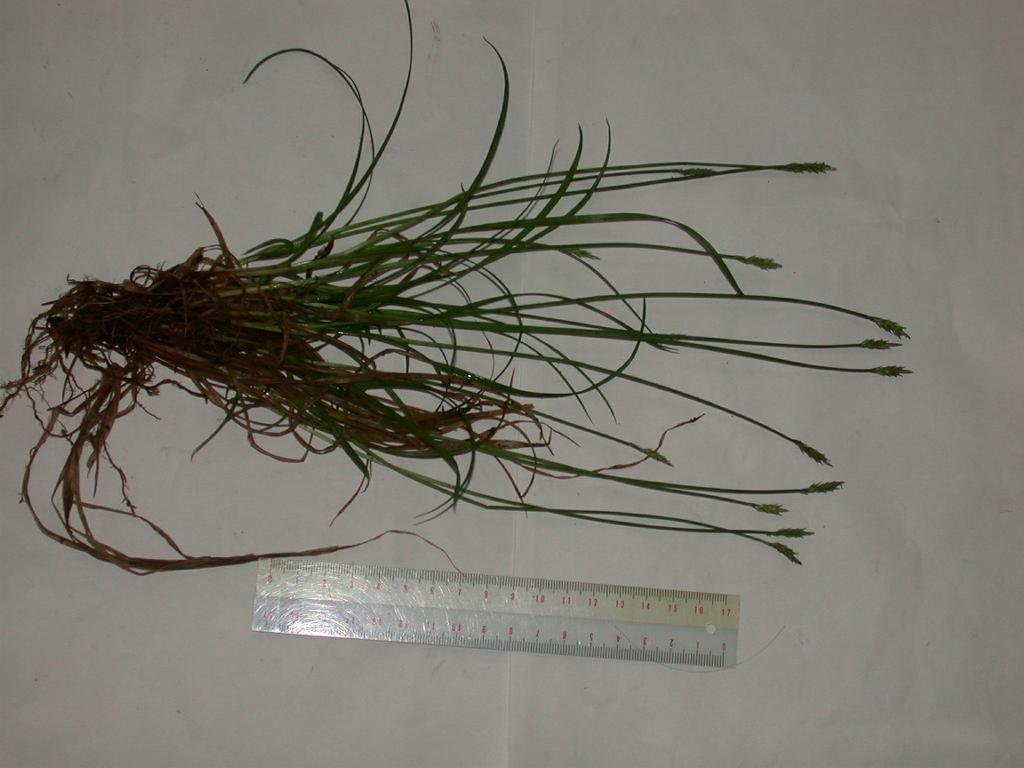

Scientific classification
- Kingdom: Plantae
- Clade: Embryophytes
- Clade: Tracheophytes
- Clade: Angiosperms
- Clade: Monocots
- Clade: Commelinids
- Order: Poales
- Family: Cyperaceae
- Genus: Carex
- Species: C. hakkodensis

Binomial name
- Carex hakkodensis Franch.

= Carex hakkodensis =

Species of plant

Carex hakkodensis is a tussock-forming species of perennial sedge in the family Cyperaceae. It is native to parts of Kamchatka Krai, the Kuril Islands and Japan.

== See also ==
- List of Carex species
