= Salvia tricuspis =

Scientific classification
- Kingdom: Plantae
- Clade: Tracheophytes
- Clade: Angiosperms
- Clade: Eudicots
- Clade: Asterids
- Order: Lamiales
- Family: Lamiaceae
- Genus: Salvia
- Species: S. tricuspis

Binomial name
- Salvia tricuspis Franch.

Species of flowering plant

Salvia tricuspis is an annual or biennial plant that is native to Sichuan, Gansu, Shaanxi, and Shanxi provinces in China, found growing in foothills, riverbanks, streamsides, and grasslands at 1,400 to 3,000 m (4,600 to 9,800 ft) elevation. S. tricuspis grows on erect stems 30 to 95 cm (12 to 37 in) tall, with lobed triangular-hastate, or sagittate leaves that are 3 to 12 cm (1.2 to 4.7 in) long and 2.2 to 12 cm (0.87 to 4.72 in) wide.

Inflorescences are 2-4 flowered widely spaced verticillasters. The corolla is yellow and 2.1 to 2.3 cm (0.83 to 0.91 in).
