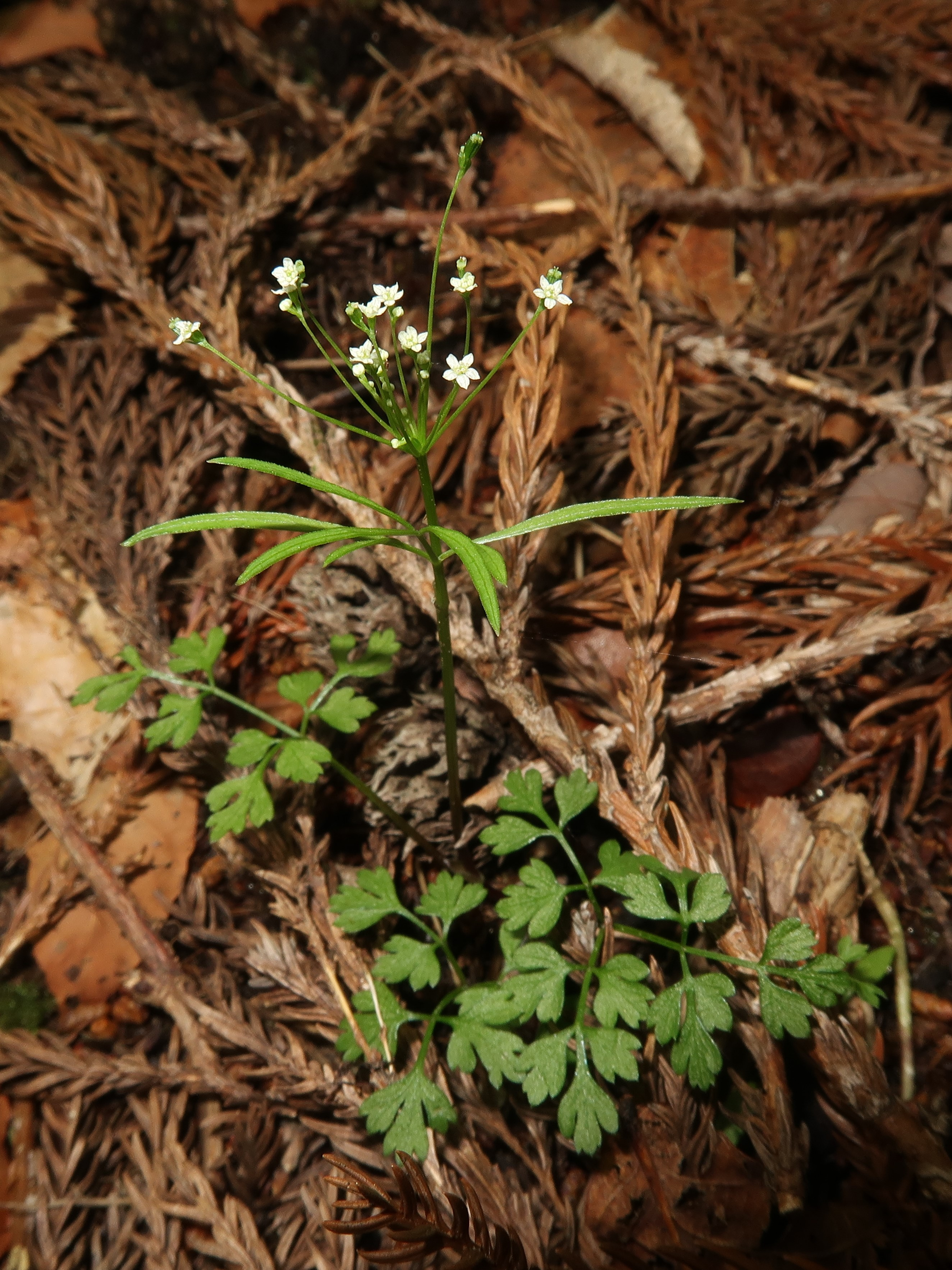
- Pternopetalum tanakae

Scientific classification
- Kingdom: Plantae
- Clade: Tracheophytes
- Clade: Angiosperms
- Clade: Eudicots
- Clade: Asterids
- Order: Apiales
- Family: Apiaceae
- Subfamily: Apioideae
- Genus: Pternopetalum; Franch.

= Pternopetalum =

Genus of plants

Pternopetalum is a genus of flowering plants belonging to the family Apiaceae.

Its native range is Himalaya to Korea and Northern Indo-China.

Species:

- Pternopetalum arunachalense Bhaumik & P.Satyanar.
- Pternopetalum bipinnatum Li S.Wang
- Pternopetalum botrychioides (Dunn) Hand.-Mazz.
- Pternopetalum caespitosum R.H.Shan
- Pternopetalum cuneifolium (H.Wolff) Hand.-Mazz.
- Pternopetalum davidi Franch.
- Pternopetalum delavayi (Franch.) Hand.-Mazz.
- Pternopetalum gracillimum (H.Wolff) Hand.-Mazz.
- Pternopetalum latipinnulatum (R.H.Shan) J.B.Tan & X.J.He
- Pternopetalum leptophyllum (Dunn) Hand.-Mazz.
- Pternopetalum molle (Franch.) Hand.-Mazz.
- Pternopetalum monophyllum J.B.Tan & X.J.He
- Pternopetalum nudicaule (H.Boissieu) Hand.-Mazz.
- Pternopetalum porphyronotum J.B.Tan
- Pternopetalum rosthornii (Diels) Hand.-Mazz.
- Pternopetalum senii Deb & Ratna Dutta
- Pternopetalum subalpinum Hand.-Mazz.
- Pternopetalum tanakae (Franch. & Sav.) Hand.-Mazz.
- Pternopetalum trichomanifolium (Franch.) Hand.-Mazz.
- Pternopetalum vulgare (Dunn) Hand.-Mazz.
