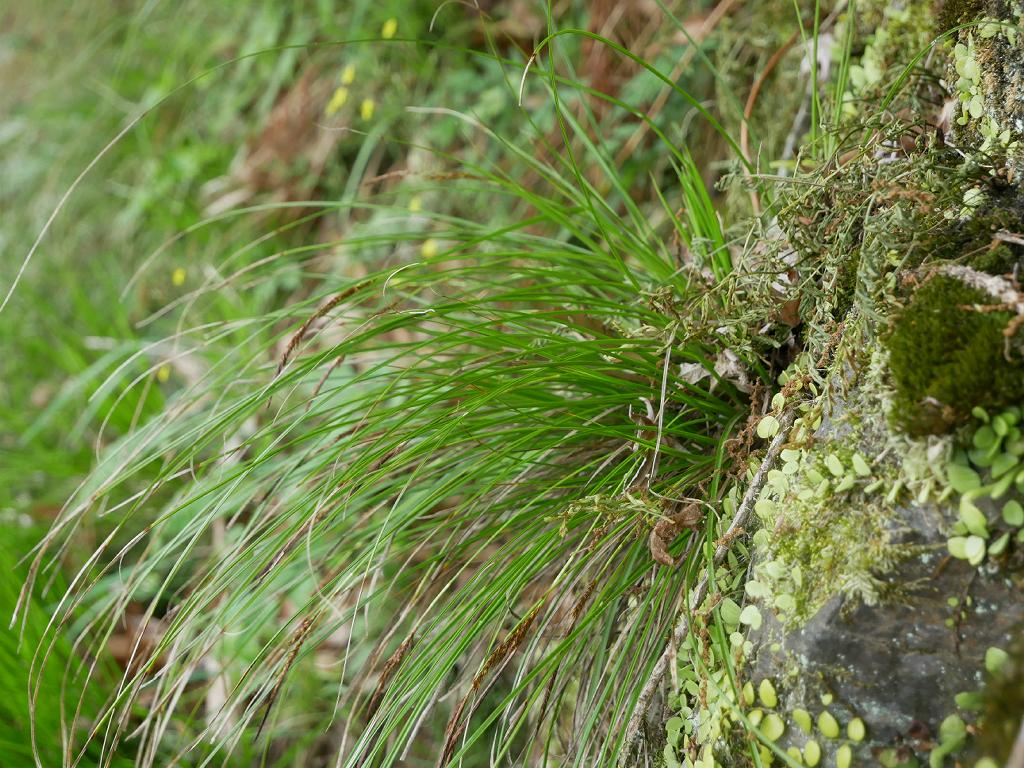

Scientific classification
- Kingdom: Plantae
- Clade: Tracheophytes
- Clade: Angiosperms
- Clade: Monocots
- Clade: Commelinids
- Order: Poales
- Family: Cyperaceae
- Genus: Carex
- Species: C. makinoensis

Binomial name
- Carex makinoensis Franch.

= Carex makinoensis =

Species of plant

Carex makinoensis, also known as tufted rock-living sedge' is a tussock-forming species of perennial sedge in the family Cyperaceae. It is native to parts of South Korea, Taiwan and Japan.

The species was first formally described by the botanist Adrien René Franchet in 1895 as a part of the work Bulletin de la Société Philomatique de Paris.
