= Carex delavayi =

Scientific classification
- Kingdom: Plantae
- Clade: Tracheophytes
- Clade: Angiosperms
- Clade: Monocots
- Clade: Commelinids
- Order: Poales
- Family: Cyperaceae
- Genus: Carex
- Species: C. delavayi

Binomial name
- Carex delavayi Franch.

Species of plant

Carex delavayi is a tussock-forming species of perennial sedge in the family Cyperaceae. It is native to parts of south central China.

The plant was first formally described by the botanist Adrien René Franchet in 1895 as a part of the work Bulletin de la Société Philomatique de Paris.

== See also ==
- List of Carex species
