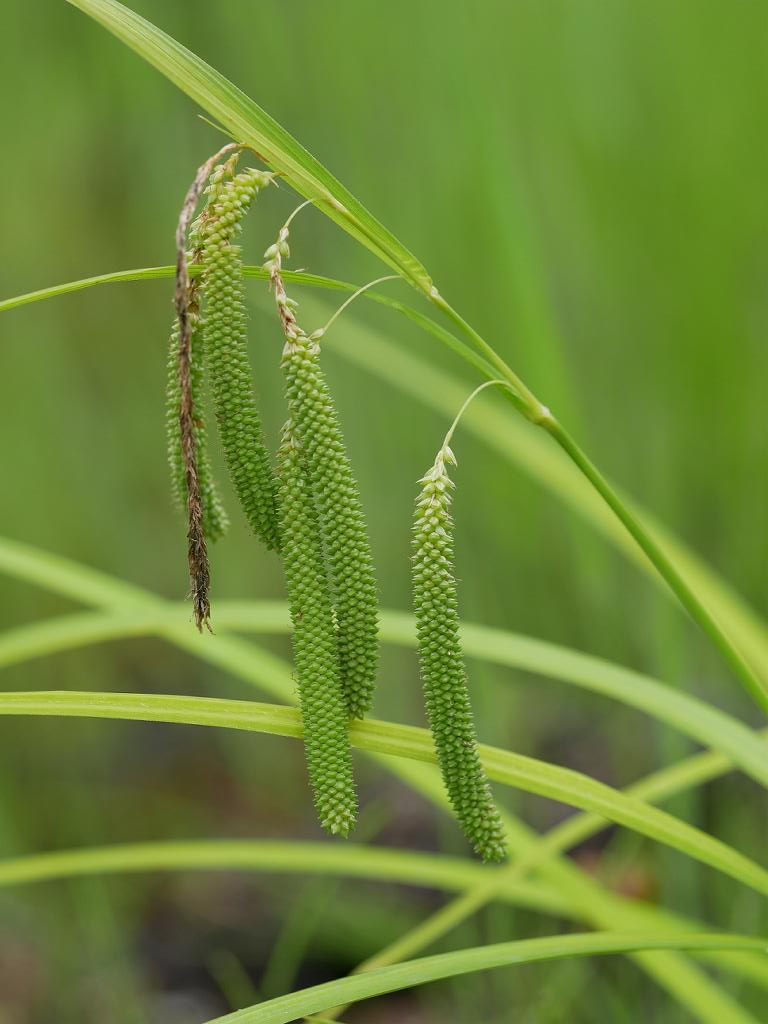

Scientific classification
- Kingdom: Plantae
- Clade: Tracheophytes
- Clade: Angiosperms
- Clade: Monocots
- Clade: Commelinids
- Order: Poales
- Family: Cyperaceae
- Genus: Carex
- Species: C. shimidzensis

Binomial name
- Carex shimidzensis Franch.

= Carex shimidzensis =

Species of plant

Carex shimidzensis is a tussock-forming species of perennial sedge in the family Cyperaceae. It is native to parts of Japan, Korea and the Kuril Islands.

The species was first formally described by the botanist Adrien René Franchet in 1895 as a part of the work Bulletin annuel de la Société Philomatique de Paris.

There are four synonyms;

- Carex nervulosa Franch.
- Carex shimidzensis var. nervulosa (Franch.) Kük.
- Carex sorachensis H.Lév. & Vaniot
- Carex takeshimensis Nakai.

== See also ==
- List of Carex species
