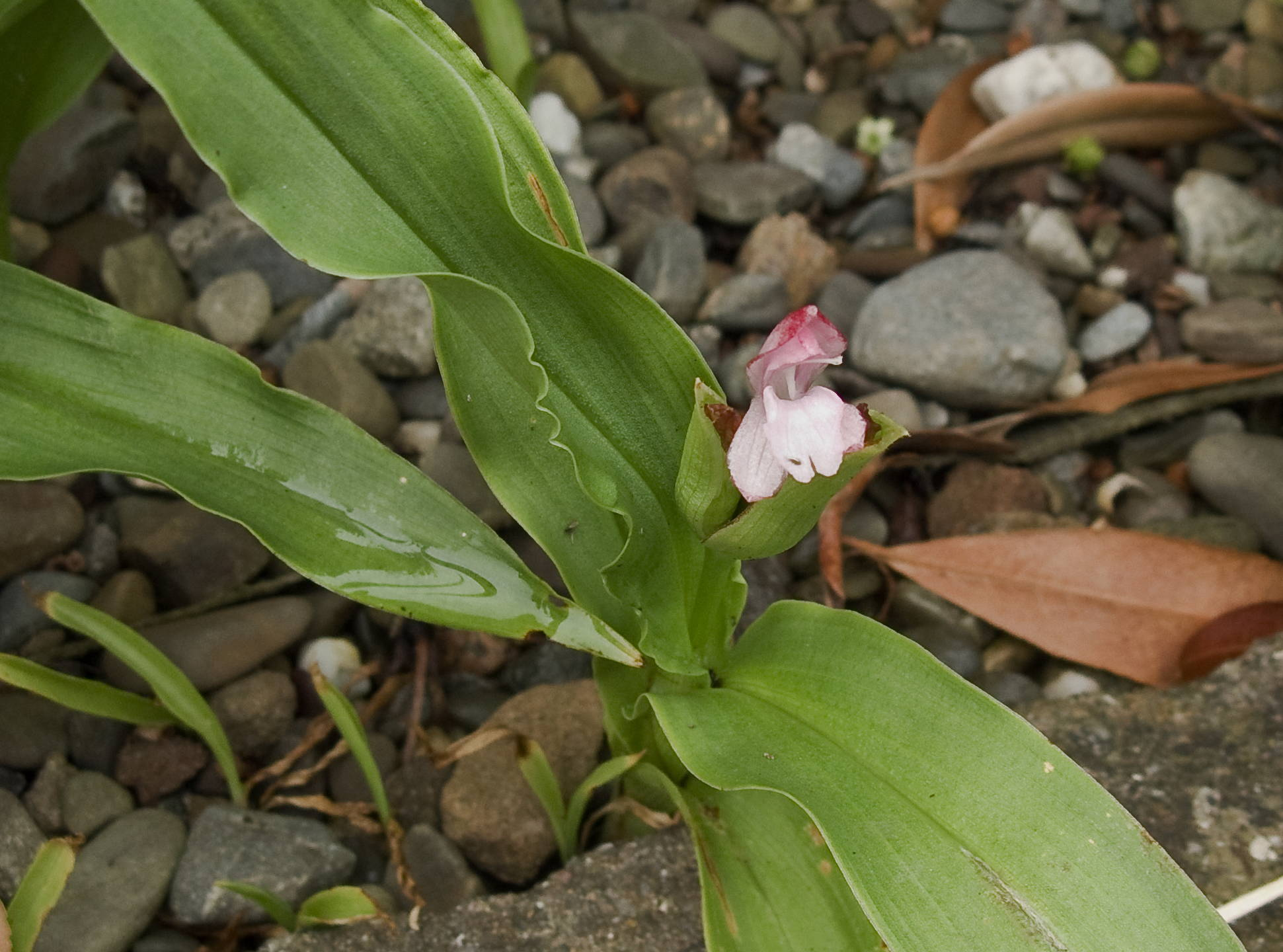
- R. scillifolia f. scillifolia, in cultivation

Scientific classification
- Kingdom: Plantae
- Clade: Tracheophytes
- Clade: Angiosperms
- Clade: Monocots
- Clade: Commelinids
- Order: Zingiberales
- Family: Zingiberaceae
- Genus: Roscoea
- Species: R. scillifolia

Binomial name
- Roscoea scillifolia (Gagnep.) Cowley

Synonyms
- R. capitata var. scillifolia Gagnep.

= Roscoea scillifolia =

Species of flowering plant

Roscoea scillifolia is a perennial herbaceous plant occurring in Yunnan in China. Most members of the ginger family (Zingiberaceae), to which it belongs, are tropical, but like other species of Roscoea, R. scillifolia grows in much colder mountainous regions. As of 2013, the species is only known in cultivation and may be extinct in the wild.

== Description ==
Roscoea scillifolia is a perennial herbaceous plant. Like all members of the genus Roscoea, it grows from a short rhizome, to which the tuberous roots are attached. When growth begins again, "pseudostems" are produced: structures which resemble stems but are actually formed from the tightly wrapped bases (sheaths) of its leaves. R. scillifolia varies considerably in height, extreme forms being as short at 6 cm, with some plants up to 37 cm tall; most are between 10 and 27 cm. There are up to three bladeless sheathing leaves and one to five full leaves, again varying considerably in size. The blade of the leaf (the part free from the pseudostem) is typically 11–22 cm long by 1.5–2 cm wide. At the junction of the blade and sheath there are small transparent structures (ligules), 2–3 mm high.

The stem (peduncle) of the flower spike may or may not emerge from the leaf sheaths. A single flower is open at any one time. The flowers may be pale in colour (white, pink or rarely mauve) or dark purple. Green bracts, 2.6–5 cm long subtend the flowers.

Each flower has the typical structure for Roscoea (see that article for labelled images). There is a tube-shaped outer calyx, about 1.5–2.3 cm long. Next the three petals (the corolla) form a tube about 1.6–3 cm long, almost entirely hidden within the calyx. The tube terminates in three petal lobes: an upright central lobe and two slightly shorter side lobes. The central lobe is about 1.4–2 cm long by 0.6–1 cm wide; the side lobes are somewhat smaller, 1.1–2 cm long by 0.4–0.7 cm wide. Inside the petals are structures formed from four sterile stamens (staminodes). Two lateral staminodes form what appear to be small petals, about 1–1.4 cm long by 0.3–0.5 cm wide, including a short narrowed "claw" at the base. Two central staminodes are fused at the base to form a lip or labellum, about 1.3–2 cm long by 0.8–2 cm wide. The labellum varies in how far it is split at the end into two lobes. It typically has white lines at the base.

The single functional stamen has a white anther, about 5 mm long, and the typical Roscoea "spurs" on the filament. The triangular ovary is 1–1.5 cm long.

There are two named forms of the species. The nominate form, R. scillifolia f. scillifolia has pale flowers, usually pink or white. R. scillifolia f. atropurpurea has dark purple flowers, and a significantly longer floral tube and surrounding bract.

== Taxonomy ==
R. scillifolia was first described by François Gagnepain in a 1902 publication as R. capitata var. scillifolia. The description was based on specimens collected in 1887 and 1888 by Père Jean Marie Delavay from Heechanmen, near Dali in Yunnan. The variety was raised to a full species by Jill Cowley in 1982.

For a long time the species was incorrectly known in horticulture as R. alpina. Cowley (2007) cites articles written in 1938, the 1960s and 1970, all of which use this name for what is actually R. scillifolia.

== Evolution and phylogeny ==
The family Zingiberaceae is mainly tropical in distribution. The unusual mountainous distribution of Roscoea may have evolved relatively recently and be a response to the uplift taking place in the region in the last 50 million years or so due to the collision of the Indian and Asian tectonic plates.

Species of Roscoea divide into two clear groups, a Himalayan clade and a "Chinese" clade (which includes some species from outside China). The two clades correspond to a geographical separation, their main distributions being divided by the Brahmaputra River as it flows south at the end of the Himalayan mountain chain. It has been suggested that the genus may have originated in this area and then spread westwards along the Himalayas and eastwards into the mountains of China and its southern neighbours. R. scillifolia falls into the Chinese clade as would be expected from its distribution.

== Distribution and habitat ==
According to Cowley (2007), Roscoea scillifolia may be extinct in the wild, since it has not been seen in its native range since the early 1900s. It was found in a small region of Yunnan, China, particularly the mountains around Lijiang. It is now only known in cultivation.

== Cultivation ==
As noted above, R. scillifolia is only known in cultivation, possibly being extinct in the wild. In England, it flowers in late May and may continue until August. It has the smallest flowers of all roscoeas, and has been described as "not one of the showiest members of the genus". It was not given any awards in a 2009–11 Roscoea trial by the Royal Horticultural Society. Recommendations for its culture are similar to those for the genus as a whole (i.e. a moisture-retaining but well-drained soil, with some shade from the full sun), although it is said to withstand more exposure to the sun than some species, provided that the soil is kept moist.

== Bibliography ==
- Cowley, Jill (2007), The genus Roscoea, Royal Botanic Gardens, Kew, ISBN 978-1-84246-134-1
