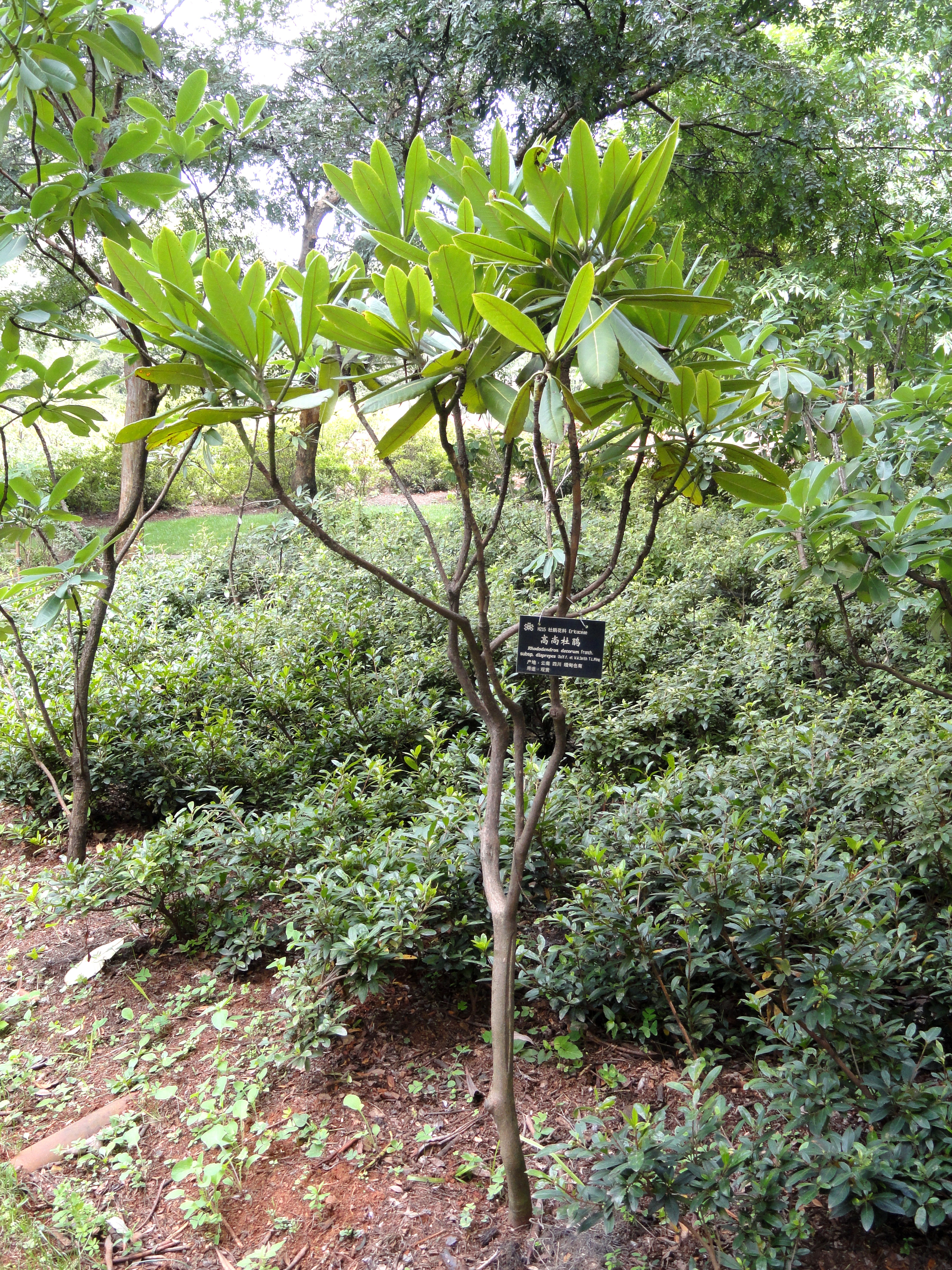

Scientific classification
- Kingdom: Plantae
- Clade: Tracheophytes
- Clade: Angiosperms
- Clade: Eudicots
- Clade: Asterids
- Order: Ericales
- Family: Ericaceae
- Genus: Rhododendron
- Species: R. annae

Binomial name
- Rhododendron annae Franch.

= Rhododendron annae =

Species of plant

Rhododendron annae (桃叶杜鹃) is a species of flowering plant in the heath family Ericaceae, native to central and western Guizhou and western Yunnan, China, where it grows at altitudes of 1,500–2,400 m (4,900–7,900 ft). This evergreen shrub grows to 1.5–2 m (6.6 ft) in height, with leathery leaves that are narrow elongate-lanceolate to oblong-elliptic, 7–10 by 2–3.7 cm in size. The campanulate flowers are predominantly white, but may be flushed or spotted with pink.

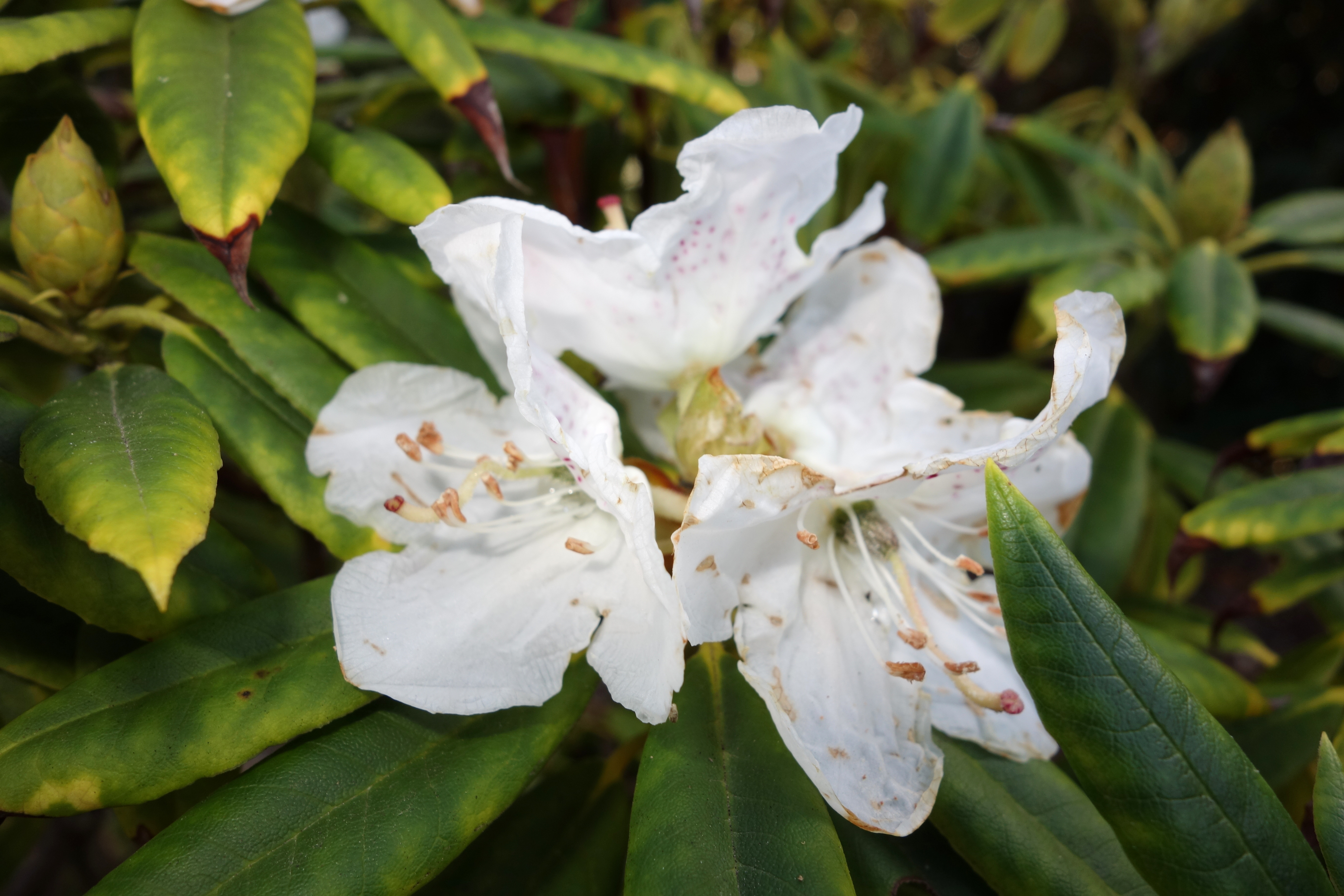
