= Plantae Delavayanae =

Book by Adrien René Franchet and Père Jean Marie Delavay

Plantae Delavayanae: Plants from China collected in Yunnan by Father Delavay.
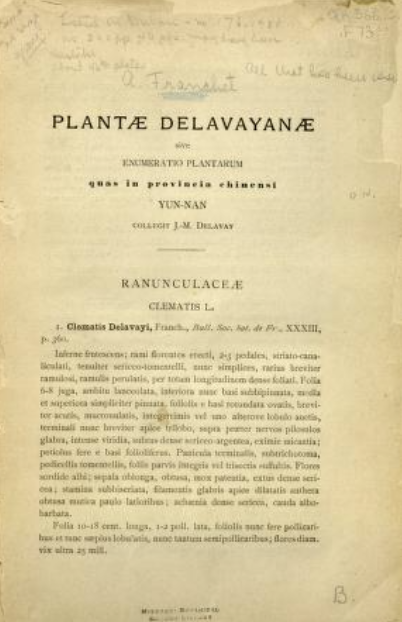
- Author: Adrien René Franchet; Père Jean Marie Delavay
- Original title: Plantae Delavayanae. Plantes de Chine recueillies au Yun-nan par l'abbé Delavay
- Subject: Botany
- Publication date: 1899–1890
- Publication place: France
- Media type: book

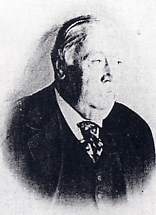
Adrien René Franchet, author

Plantae Delavayanae: Plants from China collected in Yunnan by Father Delavay. is a book by Adrien René Franchet and Père Jean Marie Delavay, with Franchet describing and establishing the taxonomy for flora found by Delavay in Yunnan.

== Background ==
Père Jean Marie Delavay was a missionary sent to China for Missions Étrangères de Paris (Foreign Missions of Paris) on an extended assignment in Yunnan. While in France in 1881, he met Père Armand David, a natural history collector and fellow missionary, and was persuaded to take up David's role of collecting plant specimens in China for the Paris Museum of Natural History. His meticulous methodology led to a prolific collection of plants, which included 200,000 specimens of 4,000 distinct species of flora. As Delavay did not have extensive training in botany, he would collect specimens with even the most minor of differences, which led to the discovery of 1,500 new species of plants within his collections. His work was only slowed when he contracted bubonic plague in 1888, from which he only partially recovered.

Much of Delavay's collections that were sent to the Paris Museum of Natural History were processed by Adrien René Franchet. Franchet was a trained botanist focused on the authorship of taxonomy for the plant specimens arriving at the museum. Franchet primarily worked on the taxonomy of the collections from French missionaries in China and Japan, including Delavay, David, Paul Guillaume Farges, and Jean-André Soulié. Franchet published much of his taxonomy work in academic journals, including "Les Primula du Yun-nan" for Bulletin de la Société botanique de France in 1885.

== Description ==
From 1889 to 1890, Franchet would publish Plantae Delavayanae. Plantes de Chine recueillies au Yun-nan par l'abbé Delavay. "Plantae Delavayanae: Plants from China collected in Yunnan by Father Delavay" is a book focused on the taxonomy of Père Jean Marie Delavay's flora collection. The text is written in Latin.

The book consists of 240 pages of text and 45 plates of illustrations. The original copy consisted of three fascicles, with pages 1–80 and plates 1–15 released in 1889; pages 81–160 and plates 16–30 later released in 1889; and pages 161–240 and plates 31–45 released in 1890. The book provided considerable credibility to Delavay's work in the field of botany. The International Plant Names Index acknowledges that 142 plant names were originally published in the "Pl. Delavay".
