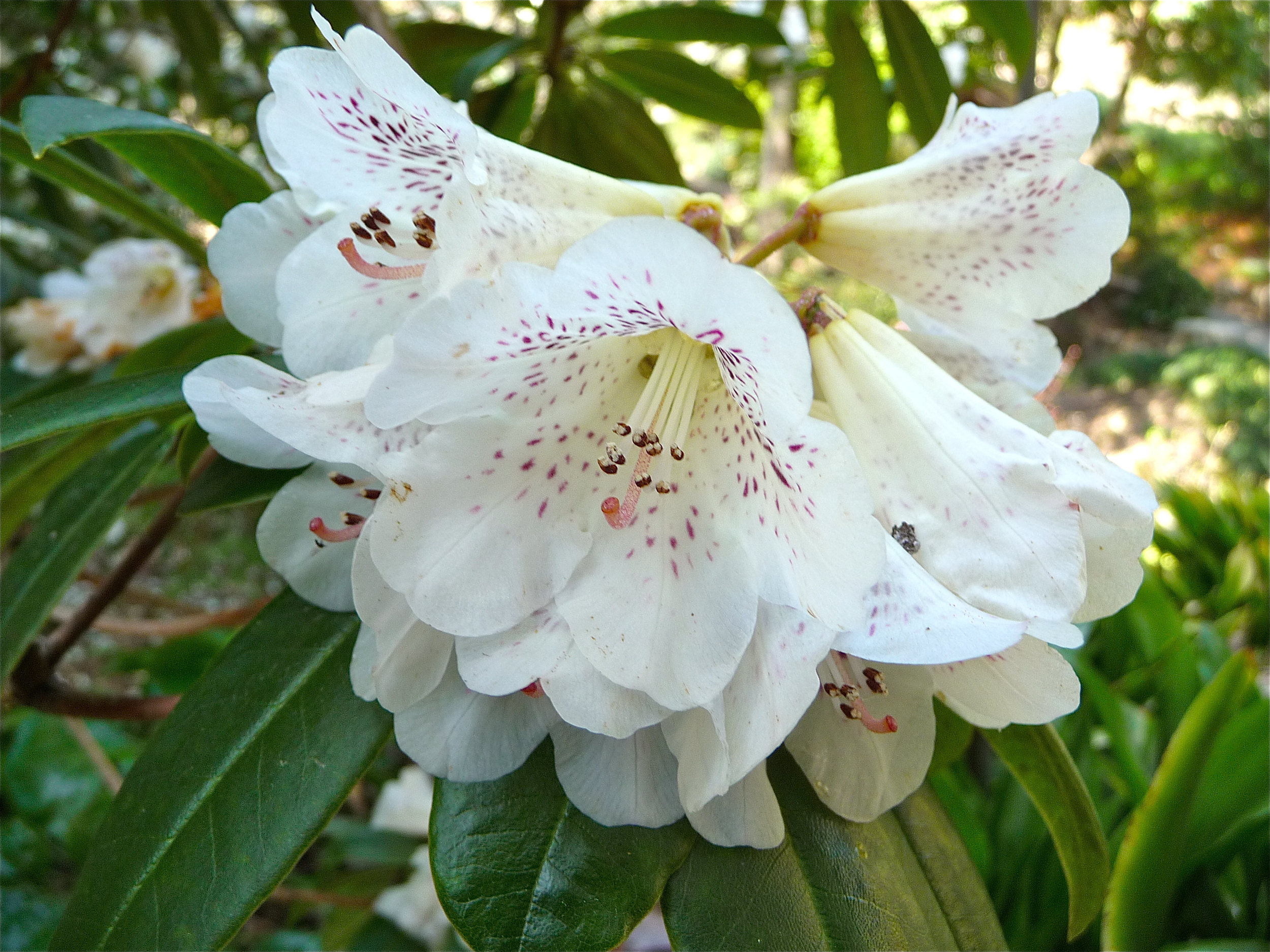

Scientific classification
- Kingdom: Plantae
- Clade: Tracheophytes
- Clade: Angiosperms
- Clade: Eudicots
- Clade: Asterids
- Order: Ericales
- Family: Ericaceae
- Genus: Rhododendron
- Species: R. irroratum

Binomial name
- Rhododendron irroratum Franch.

= Rhododendron irroratum =

Species of plant

Rhododendron irroratum (露珠杜鹃) is a rhododendron species native to northern Vietnam and western Guizhou, southwestern Sichuan, and northern and southeastern Yunnan, China, where it grows at altitudes of 1,700–3,500 m (5,600–11,500 ft). It is an erect evergreen shrub or small tree growing to 2–4 m (6.6–13.1 ft) in cultivation, but may be double that size in the wild. The leathery leaves are oblanceolate to narrowly elliptic, 7–14 by 2–4 cm in size. The flowers are variable in colour, and may be white or yellowish to violet-rose, but always spotted with greenish or purple flecks.

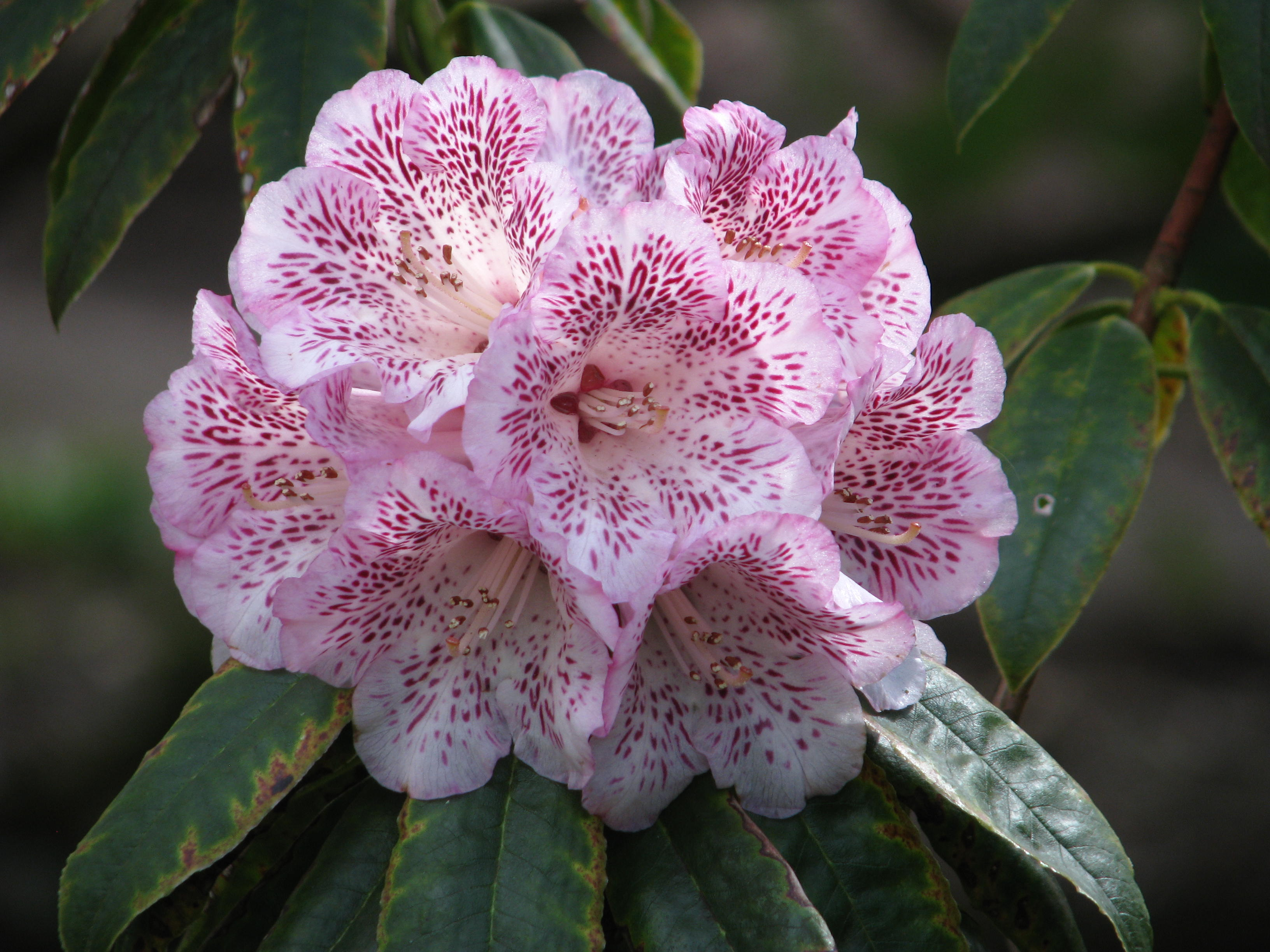
Heavily spotted pink form
