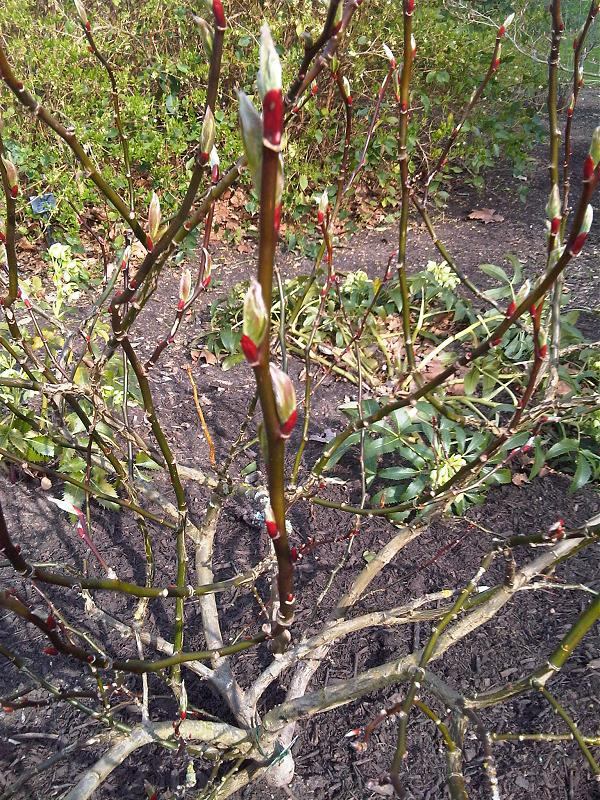

Scientific classification
- Kingdom: Plantae
- Clade: Tracheophytes
- Clade: Angiosperms
- Clade: Eudicots
- Clade: Rosids
- Order: Malpighiales
- Family: Salicaceae
- Genus: Salix
- Species: S. fargesii

Binomial name
- Salix fargesii Burkill

= Salix fargesii =

Species of willow

Salix fargesii (川鄂柳), the Farges willow, is a species of flowering plant in the willow family (Salicaceae), which is native to Gansu, Hubei, Shaanxi, and Sichuan in China. It inhabits mountainous areas at 1,400–1,600 m (4,600–5,200 ft).

Growing to 3 m (9.8 ft) in height, it is a spreading deciduous shrub with prominent new green growth which turns a shiny brown in its second season. Bright red buds appear in winter, followed by erect catkins. The leaves are glossy green on the upper (abaxial) surface, and dull grey on the lower (adaxial) surface. It has gained the Royal Horticultural Society's Award of Garden Merit.

The specific epithet fargesii commemorates Paul Guillaume Farges (1844–1912), a French missionary and botanist who sent many plant specimens back to Europe, where they were unknown at that time.

== Varieties ==
- Salix fargesii var. fargesii
- Salix fargesii var. kansuensis (K. S. Hao ex C. F. Fang & A. K. Skvortsov) G. Zhu
