= Paul Guillaume Farges =

French botanist (1844–1912)

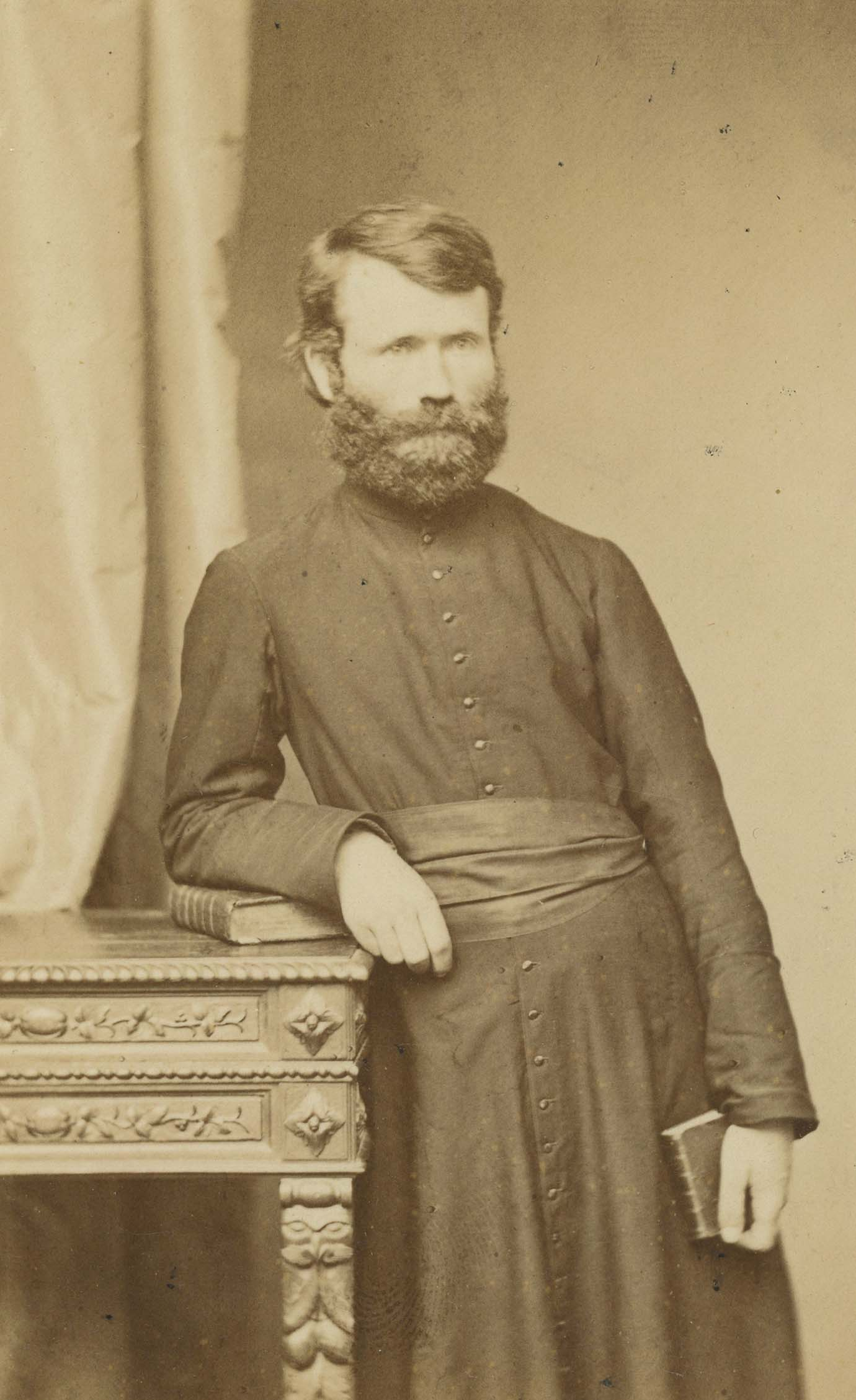
Paul Guillaume Farges

Father Paul Guillaume Farges (1844–1912) was a French Catholic missionary, botanist and plant collector, based for much of his life (from 1867) in China, serving at Chongqing from 1892 until his death.

He collected over 4,000 plant specimens, including numerous species new to science, which were sent back to the National Museum of Natural History in Paris, where they were named and described by Adrien Franchet.

His name is commemorated in several plants, including Abies fargesii, Corylus fargesii, Decaisnea fargesii, Salix fargesii, and Torreya fargesii. Most notably, the bamboo genus Fargesia is named after him.

== See also ==
- Catholic Church in Sichuan
