= Père Jean Marie Delavay =

French missionary, explorer and botanist (1834–1895)

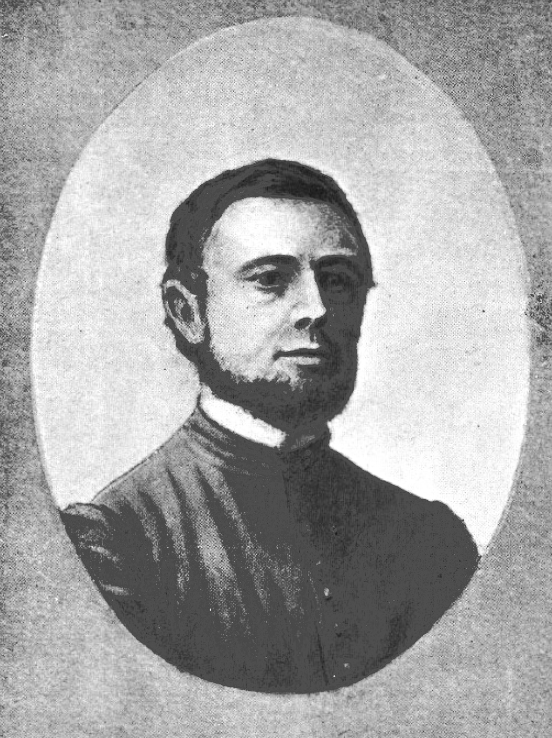

Père Jean-Marie Delavay (28 December 1834 – 31 December 1895) was a French missionary, explorer and botanist. He was perhaps the first Western explorer of the region which is now encompassed by the Three Parallel Rivers of Yunnan Protected Areas.

Delavay was born in Les Gets, Haute-Savoie, in 1834. As a missionary for Missions Etrangères de Paris (Foreign Missions of Paris) he was sent to China in 1867, serving first in Guangdong, then moving to north-western Yunnan. While in France in 1881, on a break from his duties, Delavay met the natural history collector and fellow missionary Père Armand David, who had made his final collecting expedition in China in the 1870s. David encouraged Delavay to continue his collecting work and send specimens to the Paris Museum of Natural History. In 1888 he contracted bubonic plague; he survived the initial onslaught of the disease, but never fully recovered. This did not stop his explorations, however, eventually he travelled to Hong Kong to recuperate, collecting plants all the way. It was while in Hong Kong that he discovered what is now the territories emblem, the Hong Kong orchid tree Bauhinia × blakeana. By 1891 it was clear that a more drastic cure was needed, so Delavay returned to France in hopes of gaining a full recovery. Unable to stay away, he returned to China in 1893 and continued his collections, adding another 1550 plants to his already impressive total, but in 1895 he finally succumbed to his illness, and died in Yunnan province aged 61.

== Legacy ==
Delavay was an avid plant collector, sending over 200,000 herbarium specimens back to France, from which numerous new genera and over 1,500 new species were described, many by Adrien René Franchet of the Paris Muséum national d'Histoire naturelle. From 1899 to 1890, Franchet released "Plantae Delavayanae: Plants from China collected in Yunnan by Father Delavay", which published 142 original plant names among the many discovered by Delavay.

== Eponymy ==
Delavay is commemorated in the names of several plants, including Delavay's Fir Abies delavayi, Delavay's Magnolia Magnolia delavayi and Delavay's Peony Paeonia delavayi.
