= Adrien René Franchet =

French botanist (1834–1900)

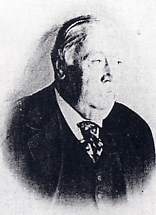
Adrien René Franchet

Adrien René Franchet (21 April 1834 in Pezou – 15 February 1900 in Paris) was a French botanist, based at the Paris Muséum national d'Histoire naturelle.

== Botany Career ==
He is noted for his extensive work describing the flora of China and Japan, based on the collections made by French Catholic missionaries in China, Armand David, Pierre Jean Marie Delavay, Paul Guillaume Farges, Paul-Hubert Perny, Jean-André Soulié, and others.

He was the taxonomic author of many plants, including a significant number of species from the genera Primula and Rhododendron. The following genera are named after him:

- Franchetella, family Sapotaceae, named by Jean Baptiste Louis Pierre.
- Franchetia, family Rubiaceae, named by Henri Ernest Baillon.
- Sinofranchetia, family Lardizabalaceae, named by William Botting Hemsley.

== Selected writings ==
- Essai sur la distribution géographique des plantes phanérogames dans le département de Loir-et-Cher, 1868 - Essay on the geographical distribution of phanerogams found in the department of Loir-et-Cher.
- "Enumeratio plantarum in Japonia : sponte crescentium hucusque rite cognitarum", 1875–1879. Together with Ludovic Savatier.
- Plantae Delavayanae. Plantes de Chine recueillies au Yun-nan par l'abbé Delavay, 1889 - "Plantae Delavayanae" : Plants from China collected in Yunnan by Father Delavay.
- Contributions à la flore du Congo français, Famille des graminées, 1896 - Contributions involving flora of the French Congo; Family Gramineae.

== See also ==
- European and American voyages of scientific exploration
