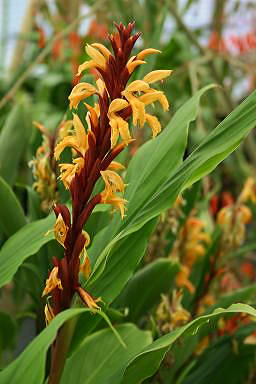
- In cultivation

Conservation status
- Least Concern (IUCN 3.1)

Scientific classification
- Kingdom: Plantae
- Clade: Tracheophytes
- Clade: Angiosperms
- Clade: Monocots
- Clade: Commelinids
- Order: Zingiberales
- Family: Zingiberaceae
- Genus: Cautleya
- Species: C. spicata

Binomial name
- Cautleya spicata (Sm.) Baker

Synonyms
- Roscoea spicata Sm.; Cautleya petiolata Baker; Cautleya robusta Baker

= Cautleya spicata =

Species of plant

Cautleya spicata is a perennial herbaceous plant in the family Zingiberaceae (the gingers). It is found in the Himalayas through to China (Yunnan). It is cultivated as an ornamental garden plant, hardy to a few degrees of frost.

== Description ==
What appear to be stems in Cautleya species are actually "pseudostems" formed by the tightly wrapped bases or sheaths of the leaves. In Cautleya spicata, the pseudostems are 30–60 cm (12–24 in) tall. There are 4–7 leaves with a stalk (petiole) 1.5–2 cm (0.6–0.8 in) long between the sheath that forms part of the pseudostem and the blade which is free. The leaf blades are 12–30 cm (5–12 in) long by 1.6–4 cm (0.6–1.6 in) wide. The inflorescence appears in July in the native habitat of the species and takes the form of a dense spike about 7–12 cm (3–5 in) long.

Each flower has a complex structure. A red bract surrounds the sepals, which are largely fused, forming a tubular calyx, split along one side. The calyx is shorter than the bract, being 1.5–2.5 cm (0.6–1.0 in) long. Inside the calyx, the three petals are fused at the base to form a tube about the same length as the calyx. At the end of the tube the petals form three lobes, 2–2.5 cm (0.8–1.0 in) long. Inside the petals are three petal-like structures (staminodes). The two side staminodes are upright, more-or-less the same size as the central petal lobe. The lip or labellum is about 2.5 cm (1.0 in) long, bent downwards and divided into two at the tip.

The single stamen has a two-pronged "spur" at base of the anther, formed by connective tissue. The seed capsule is red when ripe, splitting to reveal the black seeds which have a white aril.

== Taxonomy ==
Cautleya spicata was first described by James Edward Smith in 1822 as a Roscoea, R. spicata. It was transferred to Cautleya by John Gilbert Baker in 1890. At the same time, Baker described two other species, C. petiolata and C. robusta. These are now both regarded as synonymous with C. spicata. The genus name honours Proby Cautley, who was responsible for extensive irrigation works in India under the British Raj. The specific epithet, spicata, means "spiky".

== Cultivation ==
Cautleya spicata is cultivated as an ornamental garden plant. It is hardy to −10 °C (14 °F), though in cold temperate climates such as the midlands and north of the UK, a covering mulch is recommended in the winter. It may also be grown in a container, when it needs protecting from frost. It requires a moisture-retentive, humus-rich soil, out of the full sun.

A number of cultivars are known. 'Crug Canary' is up to 1 m (3 ft) tall, with red stems, deep red bracts and orange-yellow flowers. 'Arun Flame' is similar height, with denser flower spikes; the undersides of the leaves have a purplish-red tinge. 'Lutea' bears largely yellow flowers. Plants grown under the collection number CC 3676 are shorter, with dark orange flowers.
