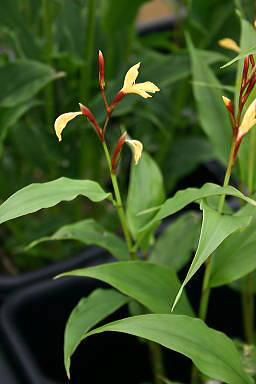
- In cultivation

Scientific classification
- Kingdom: Plantae
- Clade: Tracheophytes
- Clade: Angiosperms
- Clade: Monocots
- Clade: Commelinids
- Order: Zingiberales
- Family: Zingiberaceae
- Genus: Cautleya
- Species: C. gracilis

Binomial name
- Cautleya gracilis (Sm.) Dandy

Synonyms
- Roscoea gracilis Sm.; Cautleya cathcartii Baker; Cautleya lutea (Royle) Hook.f.; Roscoea lutea Royle

= Cautleya gracilis =

Species of flowering plant

Cautleya gracilis is a perennial herbaceous plant in the family Zingiberaceae (the gingers). It is found in the Himalayas through to south China and Vietnam. It is cultivated as an ornamental garden plant, hardy to a few degrees of frost.

== Description ==
What appear to be stems in Cautleya species are actually "pseudostems" formed by the tightly wrapped bases or sheaths of the leaves. In C. gracilis, the pseudostems are 25–80 cm (10–31 in) tall, with some purely sheathing leaves at the base. Other leaves also have blades, free from the pseudostem, 6–20 cm (2.4–7.9 in) long by 1.5–6 cm (0.6–2.4 in) wide. The inflorescence is a spike, with typically 2–10 loosely spaced flowers in C. gracilis var. gracilis and 15–20 more tightly spaced flowers making a compact "head" in C. gracilis var. robusta.

Each yellow or orange flower has a complex structure. A green bract surrounds the sepals, which are largely fused, forming a tubular calyx, split along one side, which is longer than the bract, being 1.5–2 cm (0.59–0.79 in) long. Inside the calyx, the three petals are fused at the base to form a tube which is longer than the calyx, so that it protrudes. At the end of the tube the petals form three lobes, 1.2–2 cm (0.5–0.8 in) long. Inside the petals are three petal-like structures (staminodes). The two side staminodes are upright. The lip or labellum is bent downward and is divided into two at the tip. The single stamen has a two-pronged "spur" at the base of the anther, formed by connective tissue.

The seed capsule is red when ripe, splitting to reveal the black seeds. A small white aril is present in C. gracilis var. robusta but is absent in C. gracilis var. gracilis.

== Taxonomy ==
Cautleya gracilis was first described by James Edward Smith in 1822 as a Roscoea, R. gracilis. It was transferred to Cautleya by Dandy in 1932. The genus name honours Proby Cautley, who was responsible for extensive irrigation works in India under the British Raj. The specific epithet, gracilis, means "thin, slender, graceful". Cautleya lutea, first described in 1839 as Roscoea lutea, and Cautleya cathcartii, first described in 1890, are now regarded as synonyms in whole or part of C. gracilis.

Two varieties are recognized:

- Cautleya gracilis var. gracilis (syn. C. lutea (Royle) Hook.f.) – usually fewer than 10 flowers in a loose spike, bracts covering less than 2/3 of the calyx
- Cautleya gracilis var. robusta (K.Schum.) Sanjappa (syns C. lutea var. robusta K.Schum., C. cathcartii Baker) – usually more than 10 flowers in a dense spike, bracts covering 2/3 of the calyx

== Cultivation ==
Cautleya gracilis is cultivated as an ornamental garden plant. It is hardy outdoors in the midlands of England, where a covering mulch is recommended in the winter. It requires a moisture-retentive, humus-rich soil out of the full sun.

Several collections of the type variety, C. gracilis var. gracilis, are in cultivation. The form grown under the collectors' number CCW 106 is about 45 cm (18 in) tall with narrow leaves that are red underneath, and usually seven yellow flowers. The BWJ 7843 form has wider leaves (to 5 cm (2 in)) and primrose yellow flowers.

C. gracilis var. robusta is also cultivated. It usually has between 15 and 20 flowers, orange or bright yellow in colour. One cultivar is 'Tenzing's Gold' which is about 45 cm (18 in) tall, with a flower spike 15–20 cm (6–8 in) long.

== Bibliography ==
- Wu, Zhengyi; Raven, Peter H. & Hong, Deyuan, eds. (1999), Flora of China, Vol. 4, Beijing; St. Louis: Science Press; Missouri Botanical Garden
