= Bhangeri =

- Location in Uttarakhand, India
- Coordinates: 29°51′13.0″N 77°54′43.0″E
- Country: India
- State: Uttarakhand
- District: Haridwar

Government
  - Body: Gram Panchayat
  - Gram Pradhan: Mrs. Ajra Begum
- Elevation: 268 m (879 ft)

Population (2012)
  - Total: 8,583

Languages
  - Official: Hindi
  - Native: Khariboli

Bhangeri is a village in Roorkee tehsil in the green terai region of Sivalik Hills of the Himalayas. Its official name is Bhangeri Mahavatpur. Gradually, villagers gave up their traditional profession of training elephants. High-quality cannabis (Bhang) plants grow naturally in the uncultivated lands around the village. Residents started calling the village Bhangeri, or "the place where bhang grows." The name stuck, and the village came to be known popularly as Bhangeri and officially as Bhangeri Mahavatpur.

== History ==
The original name was Mahavatpur, or "the place where the elephant trainers live." Prior to British establishment in the region, a few nomads inhabited the area around the rivulet Solani and practiced subsistence agriculture. The Solani rivulet overflowed in monsoons carrying runoff from Doon valley. This made the fields fertile and hospitable to wild beets and starfruit. The rivulet forms the farmlands' northern boundary. At that time, Roorkee was a tiny hamlet under the aegis of Landhaura Riyasat.

After the commencement of work on Ganga Canal by Colonel Proby Cautley and subsequent establishment of Thomason College of Engineering in 1847 (now Indian Institute of Technology Roorkee) Roorkee began to grow.

Bhangeri started taking shape only after the Corps of Bengal Sappers and Miners (now Bengal Engineer Group) established cantonment outside its southwest limits in 1853. The British officers and soldiers resided inside the cantonment. Most of the Indian foot soldiers, led by Sahatu (सहतू) Ram Yadav, built their shelters around a Banyan tree located in the middle of the village near chote pandatji ka ghar. This settlement of 50 - 60 people formed the village's nucleus.

== Demographics ==
The town had a 2011 population of 8,583, of which 4,491 are males and 4,092 are females. 48.96% are Hindu and 50.79% are Muslim. Children ages 0-6 number 1168–13.61% of the population. The female sex ratio is 911, against the state average of 963. Moreover. The child sex ratio is around 896 compared to the Uttarakhand state average of 890. The literacy rate is 75.21%--lower than the state average of 78.82%. Male literacy is around 83.61% while the female literacy rate is 66.02%.

The town hosts 1,583 houses.

== Facilities ==
Bhangeri offers basic amenities like water and sewerage. It is authorized to build roads within town limits and impose property taxes.
