= Baper Rasta =

2026 Bangladeshi video game

- Developer: Omar Faruqe Riyad
- Platform: Web browser
- Release: October 2026
- Genres: Satire, driving
- Mode: Single-player

Baper Rasta (Bengali: বাপের রাস্তা, lit. 'Father's Road') is a 2026 Bangladeshi browser-based driving game. The player drives a battery-run auto rickshaw through the streets of Dhaka, crashing into other vehicles and knocking down pedestrians. The game makes fun of the way auto-rickshaws are driven in the city. It spread quickly on social media within days of its release.

== Gameplay ==
Baper Rasta is set on a 3D map of Dhaka. The "National Loss" score goes up as the player damages other vehicles and shops, and crashes are worth more on the wrong side of the road. Besides the horn, the game has a "sound bomb" button that plays sarcastic spoken lines. After a crash, an angry crowd chases the driver. If the crowd catches up, the driver is beaten and the game is over. Hitting a bus or a truck also ends the game.

The auto-rickshaw can be charged from an electric pole using an illegal connection. The player can also give a traffic sergeant "tea money" to make a case go away. At the end of each game, a made-up newspaper called Dainik Janjot (Daily Traffic Jam) prints a headline about what the player did. The game also uses popular Bangladeshi meme sounds.

== Development ==
Baper Rasta was created by Omar Faruqe Riyad. The idea came from the creator's daily trip from Mohakhali to work in Mirpur. On the way, he saw auto-rickshaws drive on the wrong side, honk all the time and break traffic rules. He decided to turn the daily frustration into a game.

The game is written in JavaScript, HTML and CSS, with the Three.js library for the graphics. Riyad stated that the game is not against auto-rickshaw drivers, and that the sector needs proper rules and accountability. He told Prothom Alo that people slowly get used to everyday problems, and that the game tries to put those problems in front of people again, as comedy. A multiplayer version is planned.

== Reception ==
After the creator's Facebook post, the game was shared widely on social media. Bangla Stream reported that by the morning of 25 October 2026, more than 160,000 people had played the game over 800,000 times. About one in ten players were outside Bangladesh, mostly Bangladeshis living abroad. The Business Standard reported more than 210,000 players in the first four days. The paper said the game felt less like a usual driving game and more like a satire of life on Dhaka's streets.

The game was also criticized. Some sociologists told Prothom Alo that the scenes of crowds beating the driver could encourage violence. Sajjad Siddiqui, a professor of peace and conflict studies at the University of Dhaka, said the game picks on people who are already weak, both in money and in social standing.
