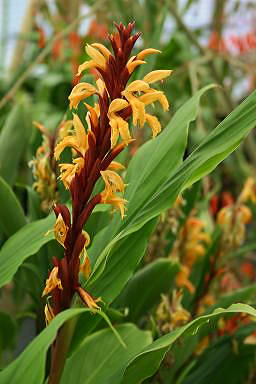
- Cautleya spicata in cultivation

Scientific classification
- Kingdom: Plantae
- Clade: Tracheophytes
- Clade: Angiosperms
- Clade: Monocots
- Clade: Commelinids
- Order: Zingiberales
- Family: Zingiberaceae
- Subfamily: Zingiberoideae
- Tribe: Zingibereae
- Genus: Cautleya (Royle ex Benth.) Hook.f.

Species
- Cautleya gracilis (Sm.) Dandy; Cautleya spicata (Sm.) Baker

= Cautleya =

Genus of flowering plants

Cautleya is a small genus of perennial plants of the family Zingiberaceae (the ginger family), found in the eastern Himalayas through to China and Vietnam. It consists of two species of high-altitude tropical and temperate plants, native to cool forest areas – an unusual habitat for members of the Zingiberaceae. They are grown as ornamental flowering plants.

== Description ==
Cautleya species grow from short rhizomes which have thick, fleshy roots. They have "pseudostems" formed by the tightly wrapped basal sheaths of their leaves. Depending on the species, the pseudostems may be 25–80 cm (10–31 in) high. Individual leaves consist of a sheath and a blade. At the junction of the sheath and blade, there is a stalk (petiole), which may be very short or absent. The plants die back in the winter with shoots appearing again in spring.

The yellow or orange flowers appear in the summer and are grouped into a spike (inflorescence). Each flower is surrounded by a persistent coloured bract. The sepals are joined to form a tubular calyx, divided on one side. The bases of the petals are fused to form a tube as long as or longer than the calyx. At the end of this tube the three petals form separate lobes: the central lobe is upright and narrower than the two side lobes. Inside the petal tube there are three petal-like structures (formed from staminodes). The side staminodes are upright. The broad central lip or labellum is bent downwards. It has a narrowed section (claw) at its base which is joined to the side lobes of the petal tube.

There is a single stamen with a short upright filament. Connective tissue at the base of the anther forms a fork-like appendage. After fertilization, the seed capsule splits to the base showing a mass of red, grey or black seeds.

== Taxonomy ==
James Edward Smith described the first species of Cautleya in 1822; however, he placed them in the genus Roscoea as R. gracilis and R. spicata. John Royle first suggested the genus name Cautleya, in honour of Proby Cautley, who was responsible for extensive irrigation works in India under the British Raj. However, in 1839 Royle was persuaded to put his new species into Roscoea, as R. lutea. (R. lutea is now regarded as synonymous with Smith's R. gracilis.) In 1888, Joseph Hooker formalized Royle's name Cautleya, transferring R. lutea to Cautleya lutea. He separated the genera on the basis that Cautleya had yellow flowers (although it is now known that some species of Roscoea have yellow flowers but are distinct from Cautleya). Three other species of Cautleya were described in 1890, C. cathcartii, C. petiolata and C. robusta. All are now regarded as synonyms of other species.

A 2002 classification of the family Zingiberaceae, based on molecular phylogenetic analysis, places Cautleya in the subfamily Zingiberoideae, tribe Zingibereae. In the analysis, it was most closely related to the genus Roscoea, and then to Rhynchanthus, Pommereschea and Hedychium.

Although related, Cautleya and Roscoea can be distinguished in a number of ways. The leaves of Cautleya have a blade which is separated from the sheath by a stalk (petiole), sometimes very short, whereas the blades of the leaves of Roscoea are continuous with the sheath. The bracts surrounding the flowers are coloured in Cautleya, often red, whereas they are not brightly coloured in Roscoea. Cautleya seeds are red, grey or black, and have only a small aril (or none); those of Roscoea are green to brown, and have a conspicuous fleshy aril. The way the flowers are arranged is different. In Cautleya, the flowers are spaced out along the flowering spike (inflorescence) to some degree, whereas they are close together in a dense "head" in Roscoea.

=== Species ===
As of August 2023, the World Checklist of Selected Plant Families (WCSP) recognized only two species:

Image	Scientific name	Distribution
	Cautleya gracilis (Sm.) Dandy (syns C. cathcartii, C. lutea)	south China and Vietnam.
	Cautleya spicata (Sm.) Baker (syns C. petiolata, C. robusta)	China (Yunnan)

The older Flora of China recognizes C. cathcartii as a full species, whereas WCSP treats it as C. gracilis var. robusta, following Auvray & Newman (2010).

== Distribution and habitat ==
The family Zingiberaceae is mainly tropical in distribution. The unusual mountainous distribution of Cautleya, and the closely related genus Roscoea, may have evolved relatively recently and be a response to the uplift taking place in the area due to the collision of the Indian and Asian tectonic plates in the last 50 million years or so.

Cautleya gracilis var. gracilis is the most widely distributed, occurring in the Himalayas of north India and Nepal, through mountainous regions in Burma, Yunnan (China) and Thailand to north Vietnam. The other taxa have a similar distribution, but C. gracilis var. robusta (syn. C. cathcartii) has not been found in Burma, Thailand or Vietnam, and C. spicata has not been found in Thailand or north Vietnam.

All generally grow in mountainous regions from about 1,000 m (3,300 ft) up to almost 4,000 m (13,000 ft). Found in the understorey of forests or in moist valleys, they may grow on trees as epiphytes or on the ground in steep rocky locations.

== Cultivation ==
Both species of Cautleya are in cultivation, along with a number of cultivars and collected forms. When grown in the ground, they are frost-hardy to some degree in climates such as northwest Europe, although a protective covering in winter is advised. A position in at least half shade in a moist, humus-rich soil is recommended. When grown in containers, full protection from frost should be given.
