= Rickshaws in Bangladesh =

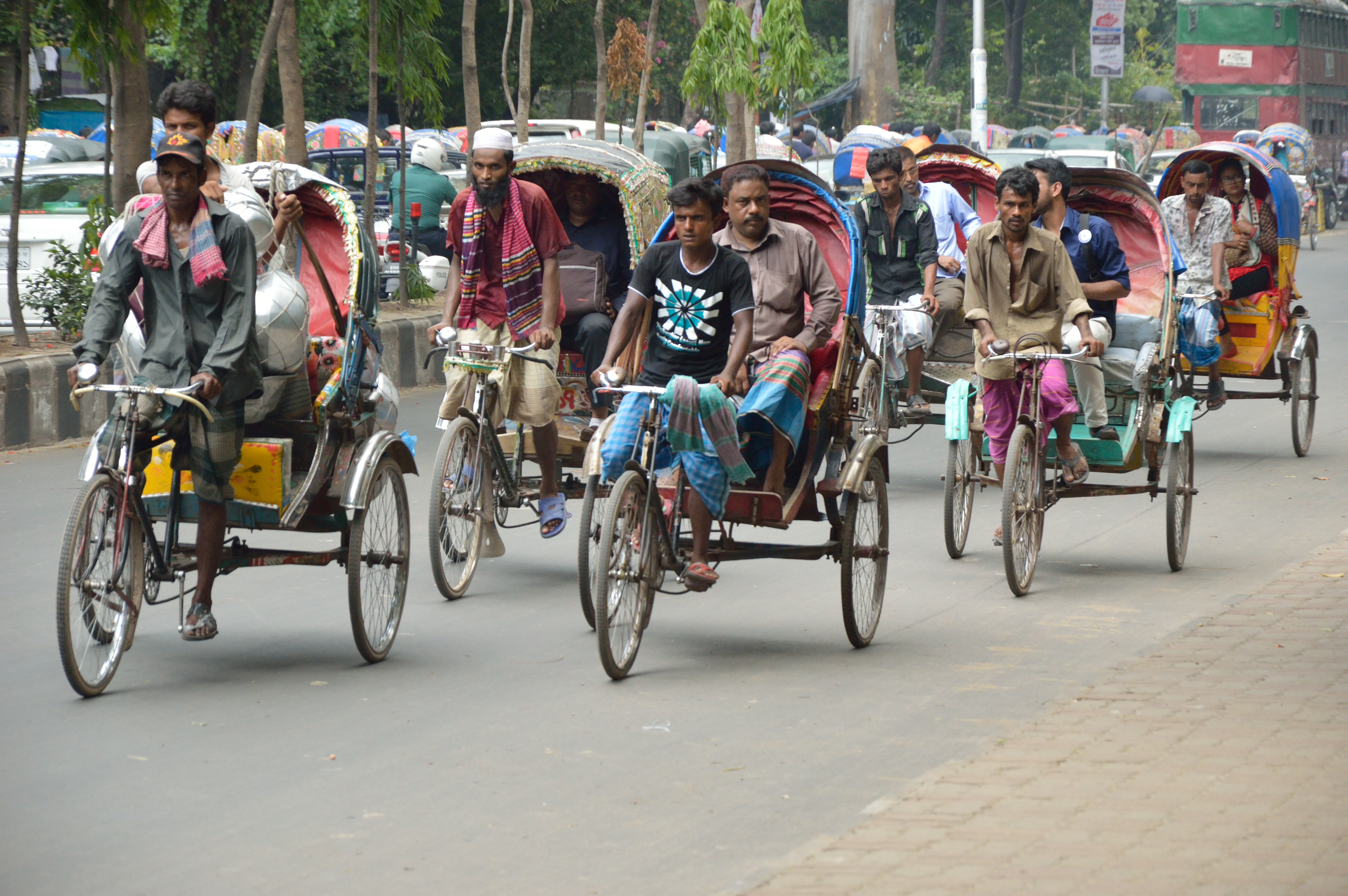
Bangladeshi cycle rickshaws

Rickshaws in Bangladesh are a ubiquitous form of transportation, used for various purposes such as carrying passengers and delivering goods. These vehicles come in various shapes and sizes, powered by human pedalling, batteries, or fuel engines. Introduced as early as 1919, rickshaws have since become an integral part of Bangladesh's urban landscape. Despite their substantial economic and cultural impact, with rickshaws and rickshaw art recognised as "intangible heritage" by UNESCO and accounting for 6% of GDP, they have faced neglect in urban planning and periodic attempts to phase them out. Many cities have stopped issuing new rickshaw licenses, yet their numbers keep increasing.

Traditional cycle rickshaws have been criticised for causing traffic congestion and their inefficient design. More recently, battery-powered rickshaws have surged in popularity, but face scrutiny over safety concerns for both riders and environmental impact. Despite these issues, rickshaws remain an essential part of Bangladesh's transportation ecosystem.

== History ==
Hand-pulled rickshaws were introduced to Bangladesh in 1919, first appearing in the city of Chittagong after coming from neighbouring Myanmar. A few were also seen in Rangpur by 1920s. The cycle rickshaws that became popular in Dhaka, Bangladesh's capital, originated from Kolkata, India. European jute exporters living in Narayanganj and Netrokona (Mymensingh) first imported the vehicle in 1938. Salim Rashid, professor of economics at the University of Illinois, says that Dhaka was the third city in Bangladesh to have cycle rickshaws after Mymensingh and Narayanganj. (Note: Salim Rashid (1986). The Rickshaw Industry of Dhaka: Preliminary Findings, Bangladesh Institute of Development Studies, p. 2, cited in Gallagher (1992), p. 87.) According to historian Mominul Haque, a clerk from the jute company Reilly Brothers brought a rickshaw to Narayanganj from Kolkata in 1940. Haque mentions that Jadu Gopal Dutta was the first person to own a rickshaw, with the first rickshaw driver named Naresh. Subsequently, Jadu Gopal Dutta's neighbour, Shishir Mitra, imported four rickshaws, which led to gradual imports by others. Although some hand-pulled rickshaws were imported, they were banned by the municipality due to negative reactions. The first rickshaw licence in Dhaka was issued in 1944. Chittagong followed suit in 1947.

From the early 1950s, rickshaws began to feature painted scenes from films and portraits of actors. During this period, films from both Pakistan and India were released in both countries. Consequently, the images adorning rickshaws were typically inspired by various cinema posters. During the 1960s, several municipalities, including Chuadanga, Bogra, Gulshan (Dhaka), and Habiganj, established regulations for operation and ownership of rickshaws. In 1988, Dhaka was estimated to have the most number of rickshaws, followed by Chittagong, Khulna, Comilla and Sylhet. By 1998, there were 112,572 rickshaws registered in Dhaka, 274,265 in all other cities of Bangladesh and 91,040 in villages. Since the 2010s, cycle rickshaws have increasingly been retrofitted with batteries and motors, making electric rickshaws popular in various parts of the country.

In 1986, the government sanctioned commercial production of a motorised three-wheeler rickshaw called the Mishuk. Designed by staff at the BUET, it incorporated the wheels and engine of a Honda motorcycle with 50cc displacement. The name Mishuk derives from the Bengali word for a small deer. The vehicle, however, failed to gain significant public popularity. It lacked the power and capacity of larger-engined "baby taxis", despite charging comparable fares. Early Mishuk models proved unreliable, quickly deteriorating and causing dissatisfaction among owners. By February 1989, only 900 Mishuks had been sold, achieving merely 10% of the initial sales target. Subsequent design changes resulted in increased production costs, further hampering the vehicle's commercial viability.

Until 2023, Bangladesh relied on imports from India to meet its demand for three-wheeler auto rickshaws. This situation changed when Bajaj Auto, which serves over 90 per cent of the Bangladeshi market, partnered with Runner Automobiles to start commercial manufacturing of CNG and LPG-run three-wheelers within Bangladesh for the first time.

== Variants ==
Several varieties of rickshaw are observable in Bangladesh, categorised by their functions, including passenger rickshaws, goods rickshaws (locally termed van-gari, lit. 'van car'), vending rickshaws (equipped with containers for various products), and school-van rickshaws. Despite these variations, almost all of these types share a fundamental design and utilise similar components.

=== Passenger transport ===
==== Cycle rickshaws ====
Passenger cycle rickshaw designs exhibit minimal variation. Four to five regional types have been broadly identified: Dhaka, Khulna, Comilla, Barisal, and Sylhet. The distinctions between these types are subtle, primarily relating to dimensional differences.The passenger rickshaw adheres to the standard subcontinent design, which has hardly changed since the 1930s. It comprises an off-the-shelf bicycle front assembly connected to a rear sub-frame, which supports the passenger seat and rear wheels. The cap, functioning as a sunshade, projects from the hood, which is known as kamani within the rickshaw community. The hood typically comprises five bamboo strips affixed to an iron hinge, allowing it to be folded or opened. The dhelna refers to the sides or back of the seat, providing support for passengers. The seat itself is commonly termed godi. Notably, the seat and the foothold are separate elements of the rickshaw's structure.

School vans are commonly used in many areas for transporting pupils. These vehicles feature a cage-like structure with a roof and typically have bench-like seating arranged on three sides within the interior.

==== Electric rickshaws ====
Electric rickshaws were first reported as early as 2007–2009, rapidly replacing traditional pedal-driven models. By 2024, it was noted that over one million battery-operated auto-rickshaws were in operation nationwide. These vehicles collectively consume 1,000 units of electricity daily, with charging their harmful lead-acid batteries predominantly occurring through illegal residential power connections. According to Md Hadiuzzaman, a communications expert and former director of the Accident Research Institute at Bangladesh University of Engineering and Technology, nearly 30 varieties of battery-powered vehicles are in operation throughout the country, each known by different names. An estimated 95 per cent of electric rickshaws in the country today are locally manufactured by thousands of small manufacturers operating in garages.

One common type of electric rickshaw is a traditional cycle rickshaw upgraded with an electric motor and four lead-acid batteries installed beneath the passenger seat. These electric rickshaws primarily operate in the narrow, congested alleyways of large cities, especially Dhaka, and are typically restricted from main roads where rickshaws are generally banned.

'Easy bikes', as they are colloquially called, have become ubiquitous on both village and urban roads. A domestic industry has emerged, valued at roughly US$2 billion, supplying approximately 70 per cent of the components for these vehicles, including chassis, body, wheels and batteries. Despite being officially prohibited on streets, local government bodies such as pourashavas (municipalities) and union parishads (councils) have been issuing local licences for these vehicles, capable of carrying four to eight passengers, to generate revenue. Estimates suggest that between one and four million of these vehicles are operating throughout the country, carrying 25 million passengers daily.

==== CNG-run auto-rickshaws ====
In 2021, there were 309,488 registered CNG-run autorickshaws in Bangladesh, comprising three per cent of all motorised vehicles. Approximately 500,000 drivers held valid licenses nationwide. However, the number of these vehicles operating illegally is significantly higher due to limited registration issuance in many cities.

=== Goods transport ===
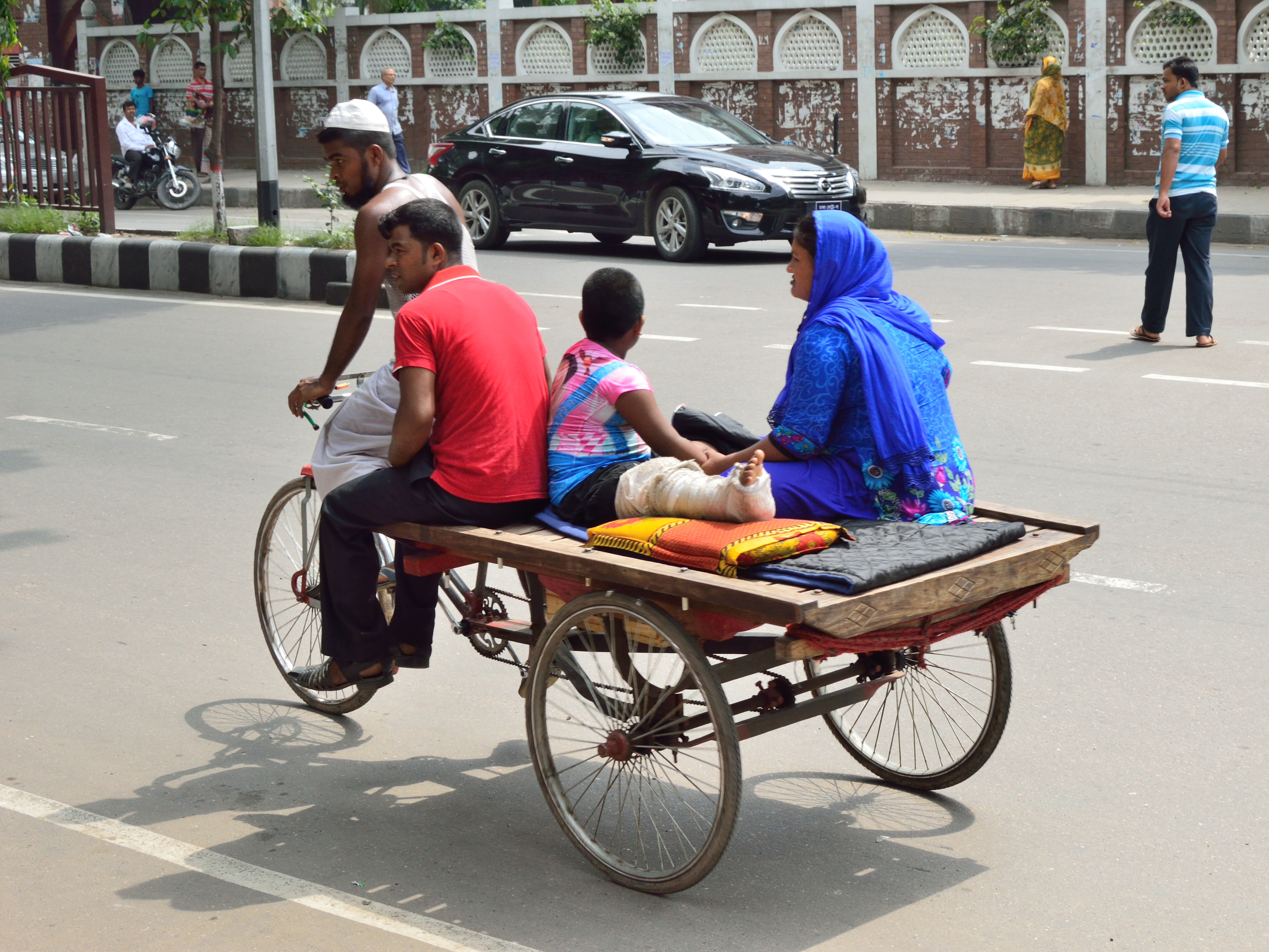
A typical rickshaw van used for passenger transport

The rickshaw van, similar to a cycle rickshaw, features a flat wooden platform in place of a seat for transporting goods or as a mobile market stall, though it is occasionally used for passengers. These vehicles are most prevalent in suburban areas. The most common design configuration comprises two rear wheels and a steerable front wheel. The main chassis, constructed from mild steel angle bar, is connected to a frame made of thin-walled steel tubing arranged in triangles for strength and proper alignment. The electric version of these vans are widely used in smaller cities and rural areas.

=== Other uses ===
In some places, a variant of rickshaws fitted with a metal box at the rear are utilised for garbage collection.

== Regulation ==
=== Dhaka ===
Rickshaw operators in Dhaka could obtain road permits or licences through four main channels. The first is the official plate issued by the Dhaka City Corporation (DCC) in 1986, which requires annual renewal and was costly, leading many owners to rent them out. Secondly, illegal duplicates of these DCC plates circulate, with as many as five counterfeits existing for a single legitimate plate. The third option is official plates issued by rural union councils, which were more affordable and easier to acquire. Although not technically allowed within Dhaka proper, drivers from nearby rural areas could use these to justify their presence in the city if questioned. Lastly, a syndicate of about 25 different interest groups issue various non-official plates. These unofficial permits are generally cheaper and often provide better protection than their official counterparts. The situation is further complicated by some local political leaders collaborating with police to permit battery-powered rickshaws on the roads.

Dhaka's authorities have regularly undertaken regular enforcement actions and removal campaigns to control the rickshaw sector. In 1986, the municipal corporation issued 86,000 licences, after which no further official licences were granted in an attempt to gradually reduce the number of these vehicles, which were seen as contributing to congestion. However, this licence cap proved ineffective, as owners and municipal officials found ways to circumvent it. Common tactics included illegally duplicating legitimate licences or obtaining licences from neighbouring authorities for use within Dhaka. Around 1978, an organisation emerged to exploit this situation, offering rickshaw owners protection from police interference for a monthly fee. This system was later stopped after campaigns by rickshaw unions.

This practice of issuing unofficial plates emerged after 2001, when some local leaders, in collusion with city corporation officials, began providing duplicate licences for substantial fees. The following year, the Bangladesh Rickshaw-Van Shromik League started issuing number plates without municipal oversight, further complicating the regulatory landscape.

=== Chittagong ===
Similar to the situation in Dhaka, to address the discrepancy between the number of official licences and the actual number of rickshaws in operation, various rickshaw owners' associations have emerged, which illegally provide number plates to rickshaws. Consequently, for new rickshaws to operate within the city, owners must obtain membership in these associations and acquire the number plates they issue. The Chittagong City Corporation stopped issuing official rickshaw licences in 1994.

=== Other areas ===
Almost every town restricts rickshaw licences to varying degrees. Some municipalities maintain a strict ceiling on licences for years, while others allow a limited number of new licences annually. Despite this, there are never enough licences to meet demand. According to Rob Gallagher, black markets for rickshaw licences are prevalent, often employing tactics similar to those in Dhaka, such as obtaining licences from neighbouring authorities.

== Industry ==
=== Economy ===
While accurate estimates are absent, the rickshaw industry is reported to employ two to five million rickshaw pullers nationwide. However, one study estimated the number of rickshaw pullers at more than 2.2 million in Dhaka alone, which is often referred to as the rickshaw capital of the world. An estimated 19.6 million people indirectly relying on the sector, including pullers' families, repairers, manufacturers, owners, cycle parts vendors, and even tea stall proprietors whose primary clients consists of rickshaw pullers. In some regions, rickshaw pulling is a seasonal occupation, complementing agricultural or other work throughout the year. In bigger towns, like Dhaka, multiple pullers are employed per rickshaw. The economic impact of rickshaws is substantial, contributing about six per cent to Bangladesh's annual gross domestic product, or about US$4.8 billion. Research suggests that rickshaws account for 34 per cent of the transport sector's total value-added, surpassing motorised road transport by more than double, and exceeding the contributions of Bangladesh Railway and Biman Bangladesh Airlines by factors of 12 and 12.5, respectively. Despite this economic significance, Bangladesh's transport policy has paradoxically favoured increased motorisation whilst discouraging non-motorised transport options.

=== Manufacturing ===
Rickshaws are predominantly assembled in local workshops (garages) scattered throughout towns, utilising a largely manual process overseen by mechanics. The manufacturing of cycle rickshaws is closely intertwined with the bicycle industry, with approximately half of a rickshaw's value derived from imported components. There are more than 5,000 garages in Dhaka.

While electric rickshaws, known as "easy bikes," used to be primarily imported from China, about half are now manufactured locally in almost all districts by mechanics who often replicate existing designs. Alongside this, illegal lead recycling industries have emerged to meet the growing demand for batteries in e-rickshaws, employing workers in hazardous conditions. A 2020 UNEP report estimated that 1.5 million e-rickshaws in Bangladesh generated 90,000 tonnes, or about 77 per cent of used lead-acid batteries annually.

Bajaj dominates 90 per cent of Bangladesh's fossil fuel-run three-wheeler market, with most vehicles sold by Uttara Motors, the importer and distributor of Bajaj's CNG-run three-wheelers. Runner Automobiles, as the first and sole manufacturer of Bajaj RE three-wheeler CNG and LPG vehicles in Bangladesh since 2023, has modern manufacturing facilities, including advanced welding lines, spot welding guns, and robots. At least 70 per cent of the parts, including chassis and body, are locally manufactured.

=== Ownership and operation ===
The ownership structure of rickshaws in Bangladesh varies significantly across urban and rural areas. In most locations, rickshaw pullers rarely own their vehicles, with puller-ownership rates being highest in rural regions and notably lower in major cities such as Dhaka and Chittagong. Larger urban centres typically see rickshaws operated in shifts, often by rural migrants. The situation in Dhaka exemplifies the challenges faced by rickshaw pullers in metropolitan areas. The vast majority of these workers live in precarious conditions, residing in slums and vulnerable to various health issues. Most are illiterate and come from disadvantaged socio-economic backgrounds, frequently encountering social stigma. In Dhaka, an overwhelming 96 per cent of pullers rent their rickshaws rather than owning them. Furthermore, these workers generally lack awareness of their rights and are not organised into trade unions, leaving them with little collective bargaining power to improve their working conditions.

== Rickshaw art ==
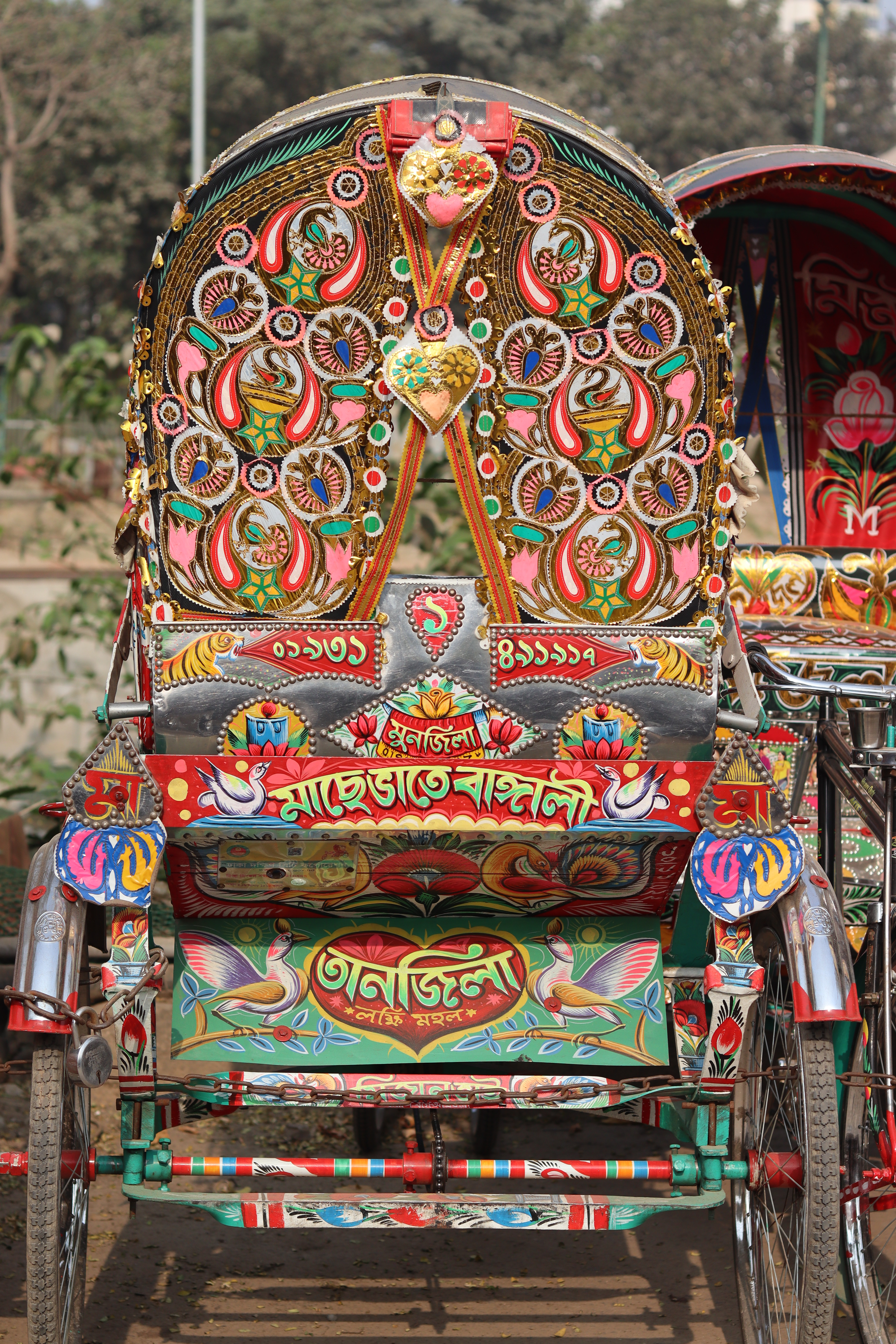
A cycle rickshaw with motifs and decorative text

On 6 December 2023, UNESCO announced the addition of Dhaka's rickshaws and their associated artwork to the Representative List of the Intangible Cultural Heritage of Humanity. Regional variations in rickshaw art have been observed across Bangladesh. In Dhaka, film stars' faces are typically painted in blue or pink hues. Sylhet-area rickshaws often feature religious sayings, whilst those in Khulna commonly depict train driving or aircraft in flight. However, the practice is reportedly declining due to the emergence of motorised rickshaws and increasing costs, among other factors.

== Criticisms ==
=== Design ===
Cycle rickshaws have faced criticism for their rudimentary design and inefficiency, which make them challenging to operate. The vehicles' shortcomings include poor suspension and braking systems, unsuitable gearing, unwieldy steering, fragile wheels, and an elevated centre of gravity. Additionally, they are often unnecessarily heavy and suffer from various other design flaws. During the 1970s and 1980s, both governmental and non-governmental organisations attempted to improve rickshaw designs. These efforts encompassed motorisation and structural redesigns. However, such initiatives largely failed to gain widespread adoption, primarily due to increased costs and only marginal improvements in performance. Moreover, there was a general lack of enthusiasm for these new designs amongst users and operators.

These design flaws inherent in cycle rickshaws are exacerbated when the vehicles are retrofitted with electric conversion kits. Such modifications can render the rickshaws even more susceptible to accidents.

=== Environment ===
The growing demand for 'easy bikes' has led to a significant increase in lead-acid battery usage. Approximately 97 per cent of these batteries are produced by recycling old batteries and scrap metal. This recycling process poses environmental risks, as it results in air pollution from vaporised lead and environmental contamination from discarded acid.

=== Traffic ===
Rickshaws have often been cited as a contributing factor to urban traffic congestion due to their slow-moving nature. Reports have also indicated that rickshaw drivers fail to adhere to designated lanes and traffic regulations, further exacerbating the problem.

== See also ==
- Country boats in Bangladesh
- Transport in Bangladesh
