= Country boats in Bangladesh =

Water transport in Bangladesh

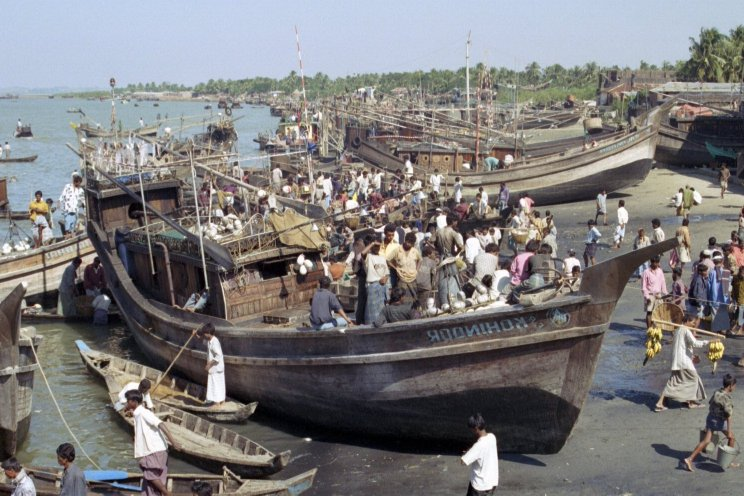
Sampan and dingi type boats at Cox's Bazar

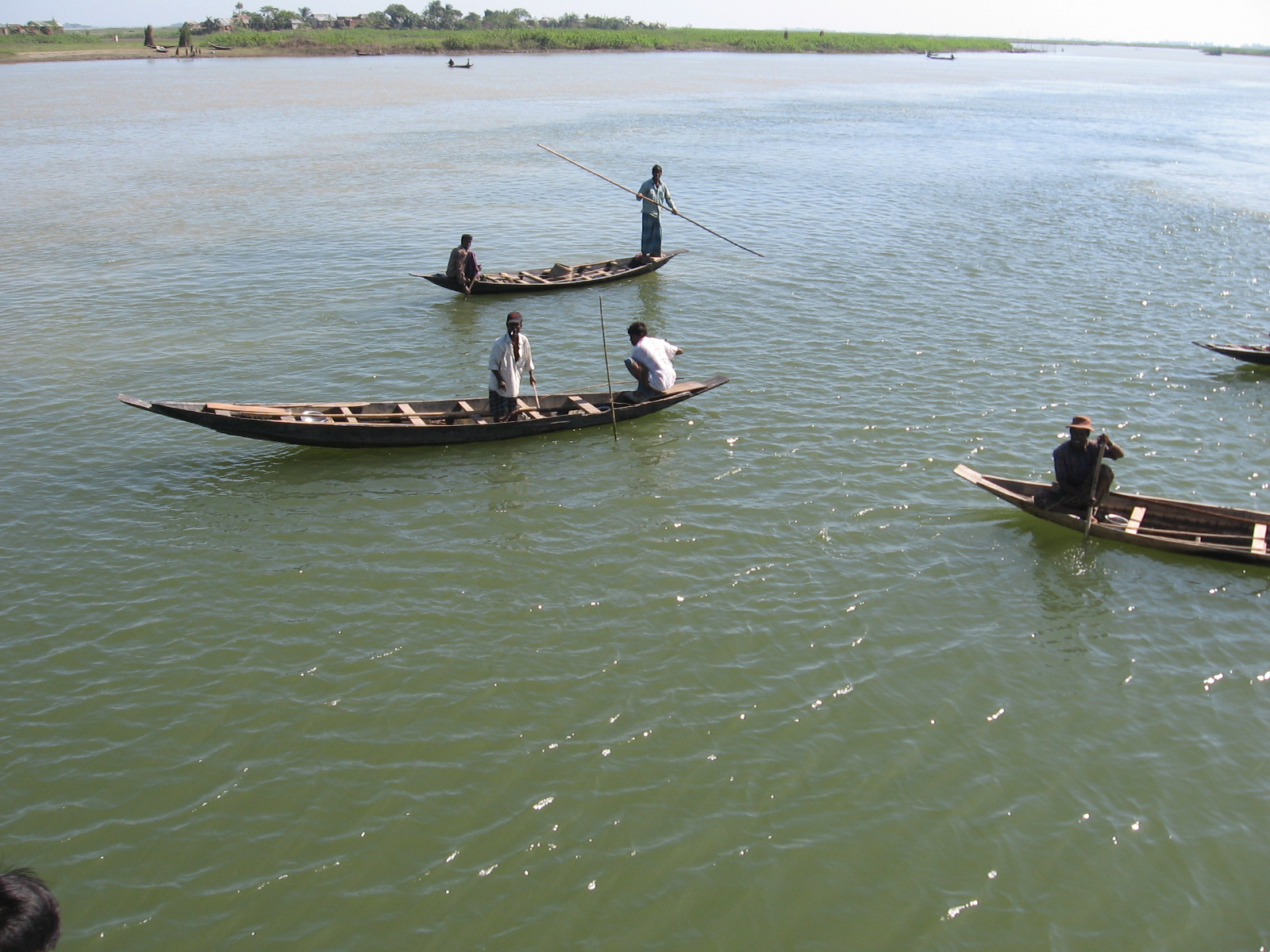
Country boats in the haor areas of Sunamganj District

Water transportation is a vital means of communication in Bangladesh, a floodplain with approximately 405 rivers and numerous oxbow lakes (locally known as haor). Traditional country boats remain popular for providing low-cost, convenient transport across this extensive inland waterway network. Approximately 150 types of boats still populate the floodplain, varying in design, size, and construction materials.

Rivers and boats are central to traditional Bengali culture and have long captivated generations of Bengali artists and poets.

== Types ==
- Dingi (dinghy)
- Large boats

Sampan, Balar

== Boat making ==
Wood is the most commonly used material. Traditionally, boats are made by carpenters who learn their skill through an apprenticeship. Seasoning of timber is important in boat making. Commonly used timbers come from local woods such as jarul (Dipterocarpus turbinatus), sal (Shorea robusta), sundari (Heritiera fomes), and Burma teak (Tectona grandis).

=== Preservation of craftsmanship ===
While wooden boats are still frequently used in Bangladeshi rural life, they are often mechanised, and the intricate craftsmanship involved in making these boats is largely underutilised. Very few steps are being taken to preserve these techniques, and among them is Friendship, whose cultural preservation sector is working with some of the last master craftsmen of wooden boats to recreate them, as well as record and research the history and techniques of boat-making. In 2006, Runa Khan Marre of Friendship was awarded a Rolex Award for Enterprise for her work in preserving traditional Bengali boat-building skills.

== Gallery ==
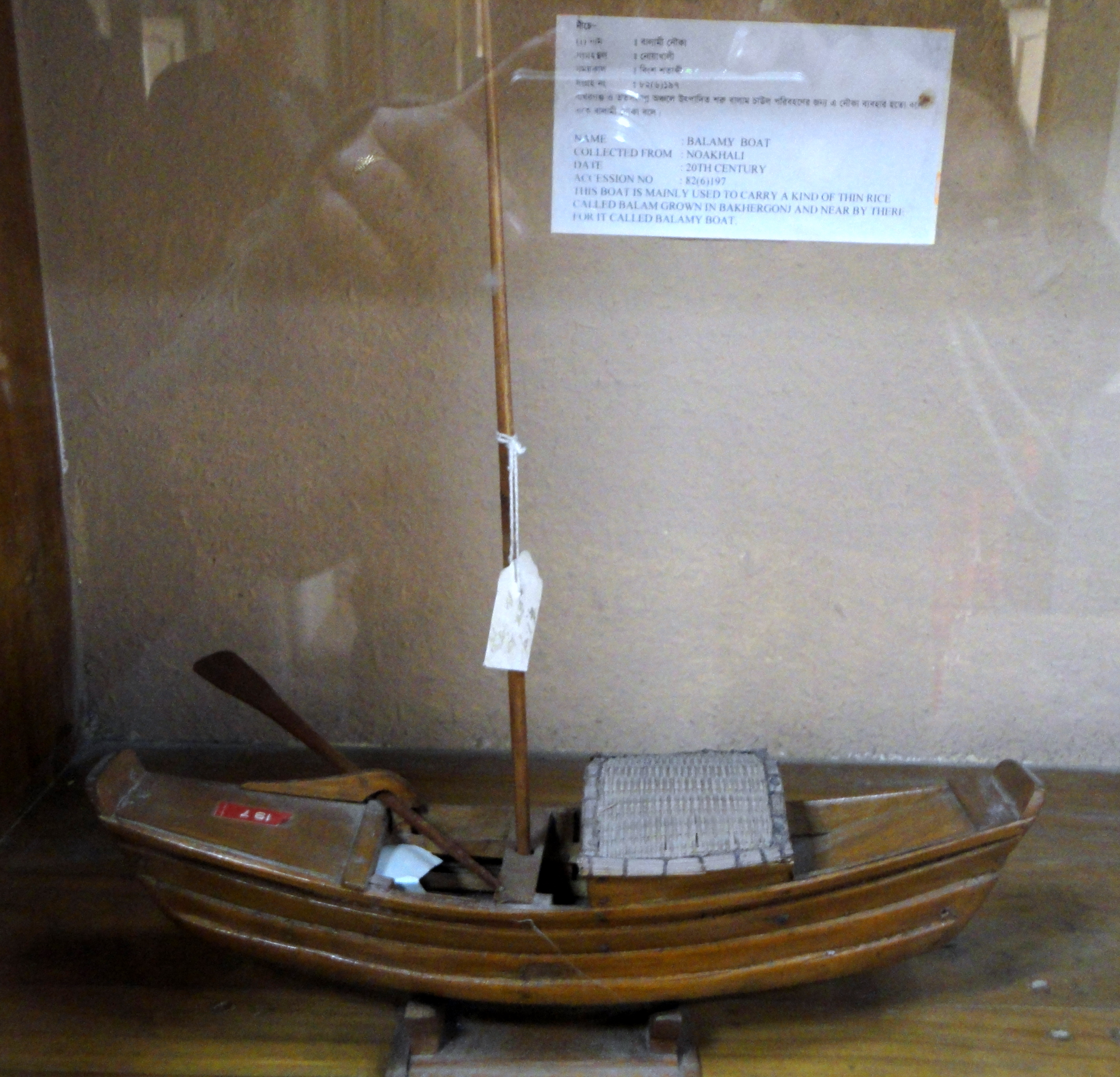
A miniature model of Balami Nouka

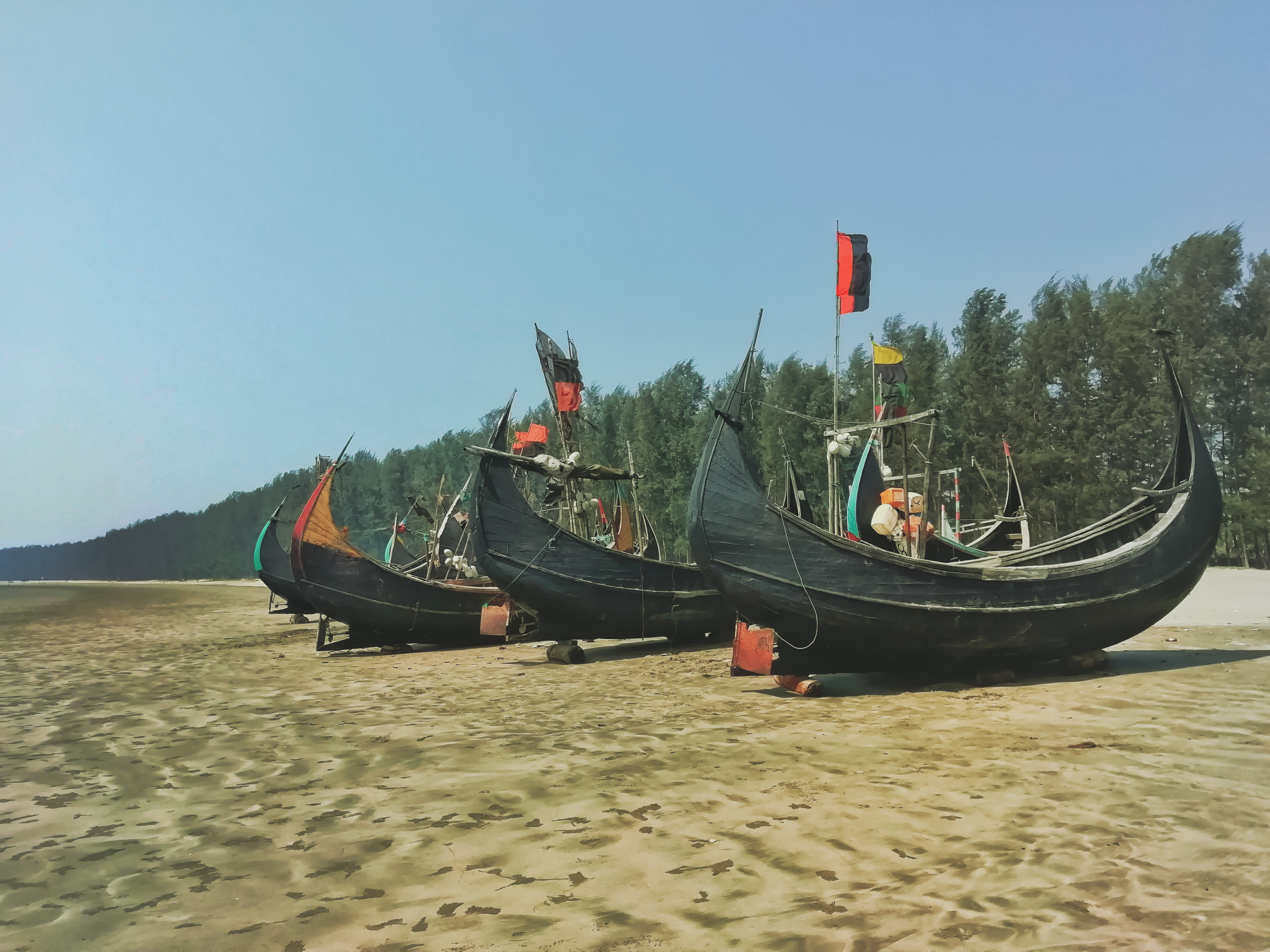
The moon boat is a traditional fishing boat from Cox's Bazar District (কক্সবাজার জেলা) in southeastern Bangladesh.

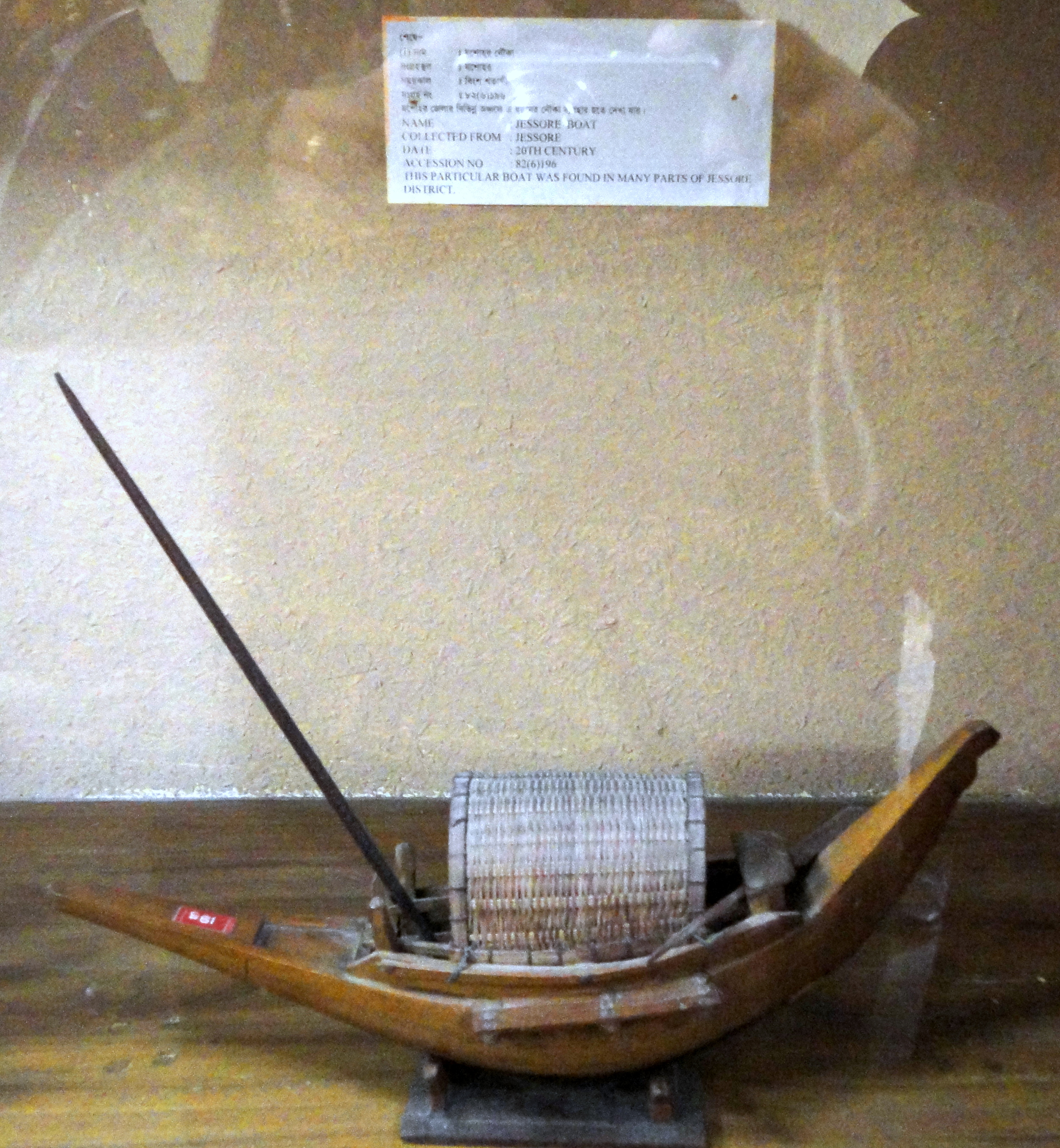
A miniature model of Jessore Nouka

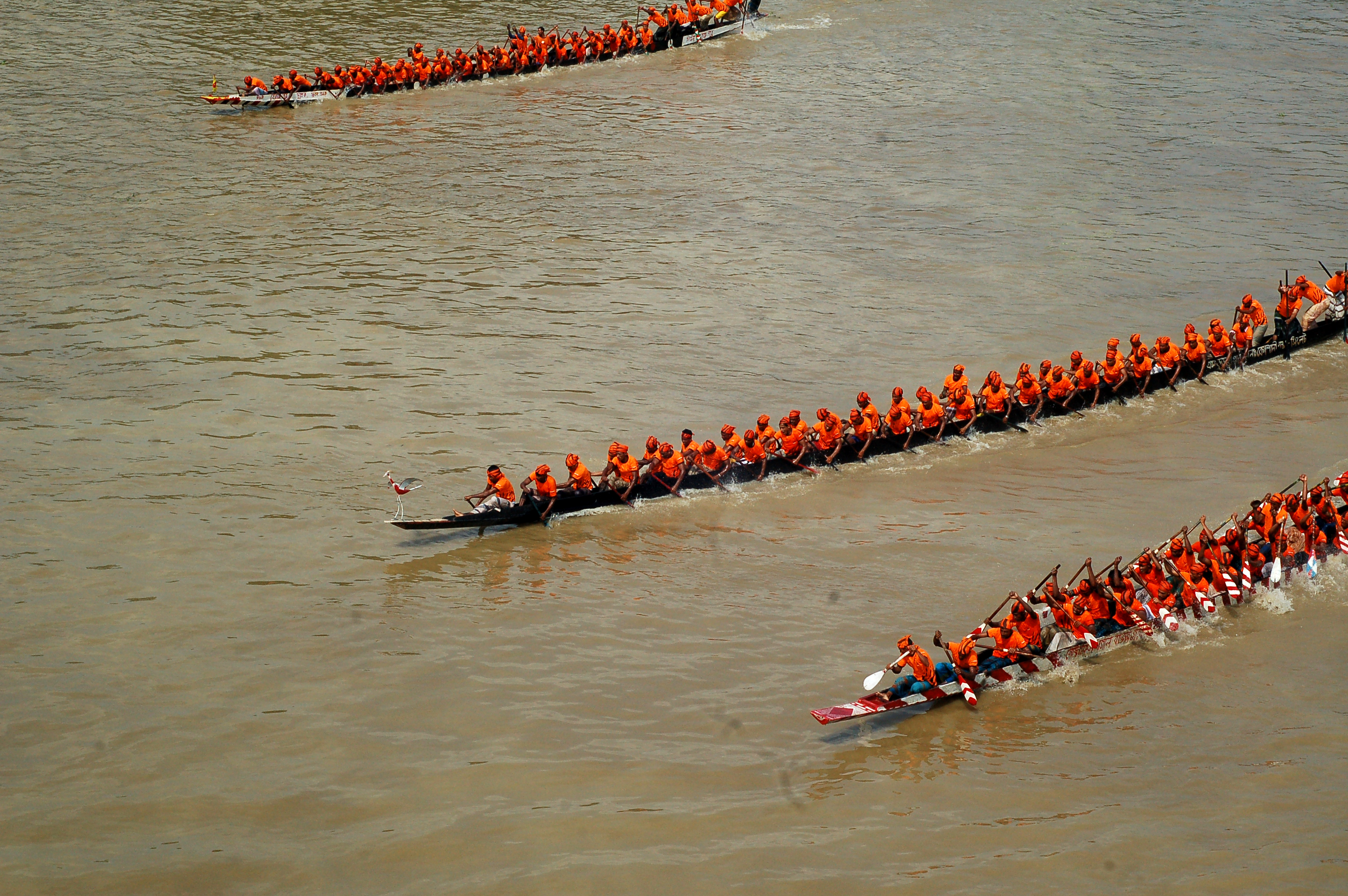
Nouka Baich (Boat Race) is one of the most traditional forms of entertainment for the people of Bangladesh.

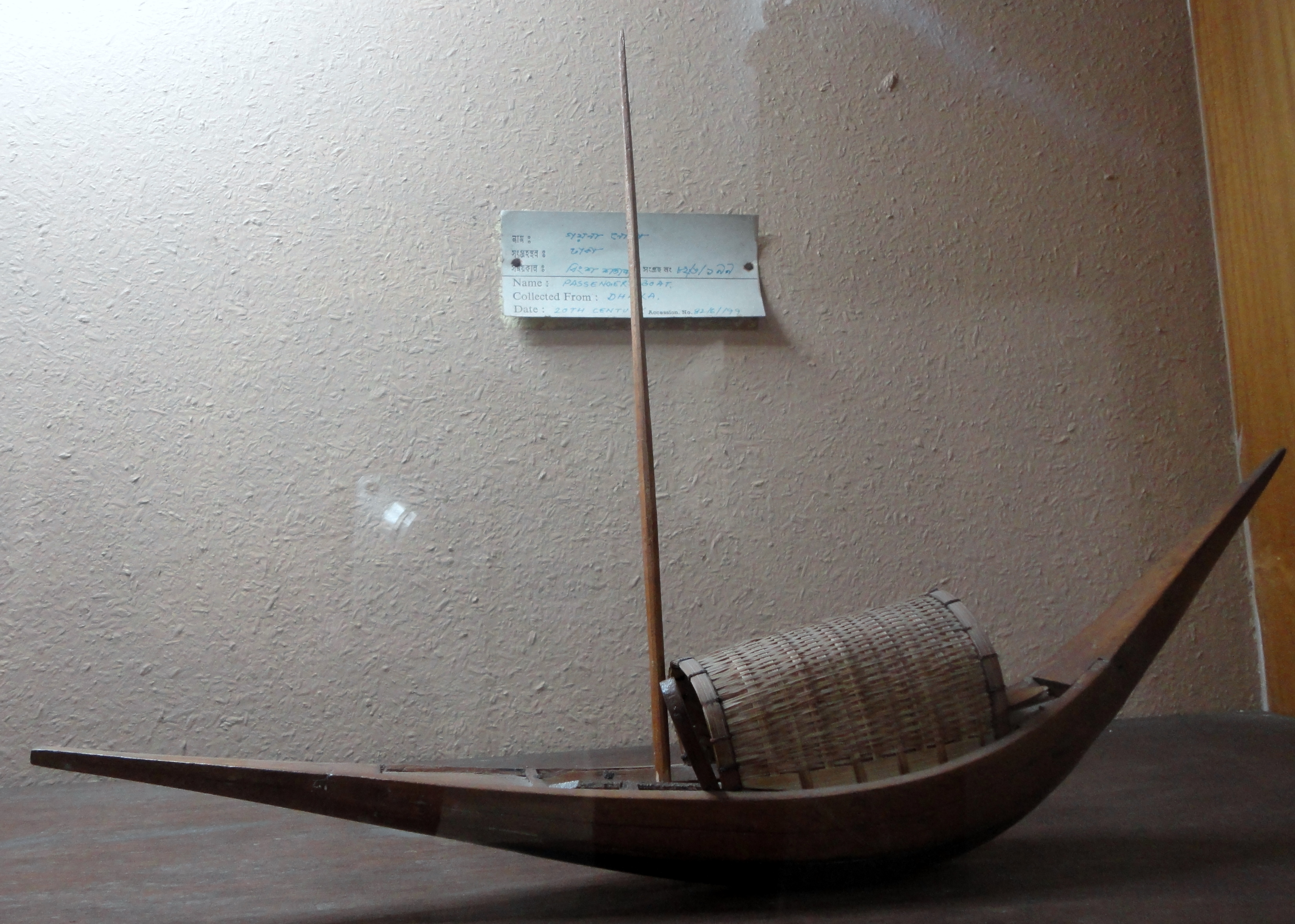
A miniature model of Goyna Nouka

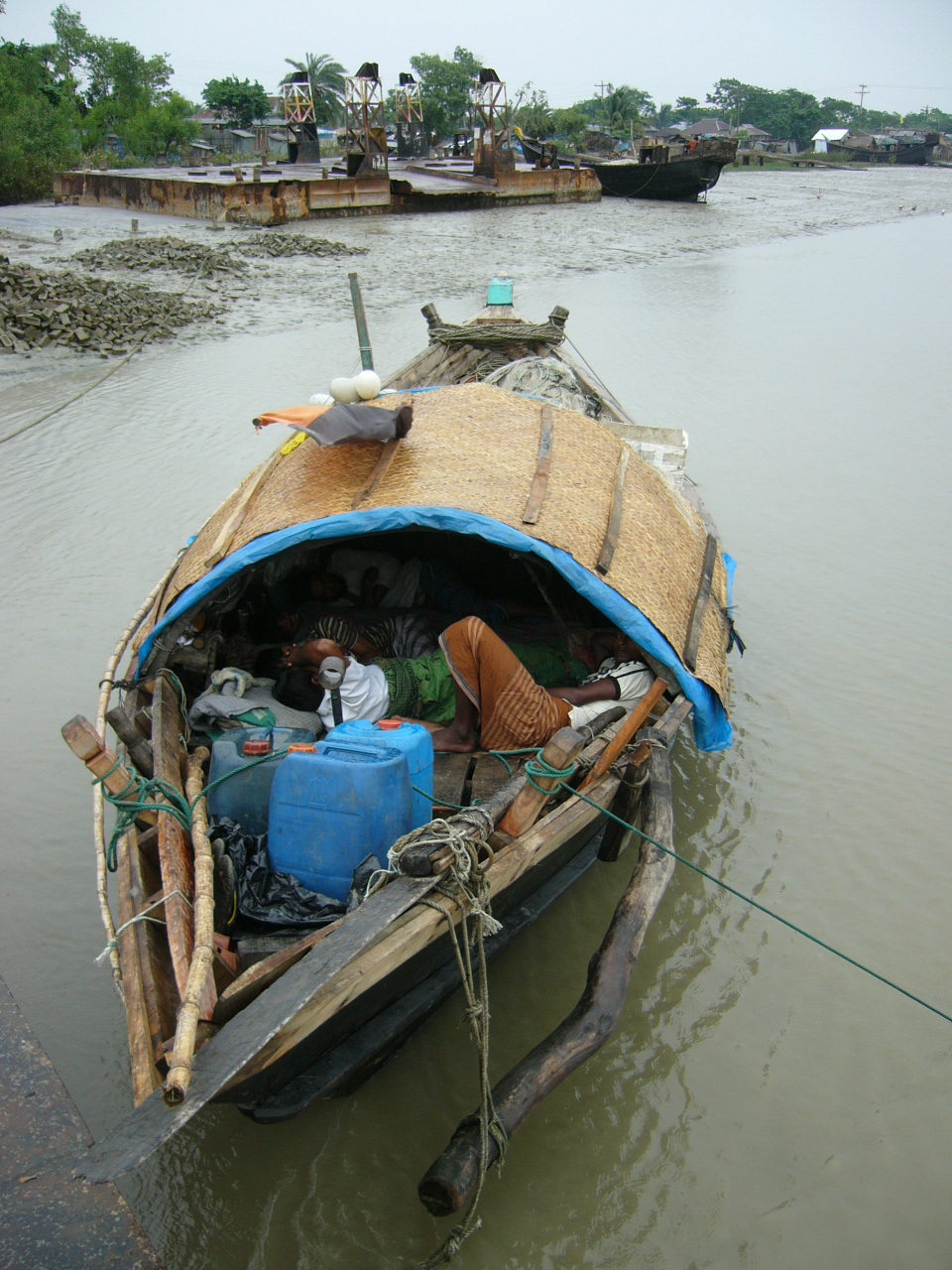
Bangladeshi fisherman resting in the shade of a sampan in Barishal.

== See also ==
- Budgerow (bajra)
- Transport in Bangladesh
- List of rivers of Bangladesh
- List of Indian timber trees
