= Marquis of Wellington (ship) =

A number of sailing ships have been named Marquis of Wellington:

- Marquis of Wellington, a 653-ton merchantman launched in 1801 at Calcutta as Betsey. She made two voyages for the British East India Company, one under each name. She was wrecked in 1818.
- Marquis of Wellington (1812 EIC ship), of 961 or 109030/94 tons (bm), was laid down on 30 April 1811 as Lord Nelson, but was launched on 22 October 1812 by Frances Barnard, Son & Roberts, Deptford, for Henry Bonham. Her first captain, John Wood, received a letter of marque on 20 January 1813. That letter gave her complement as 120 men and her armament as thirty-two 18-pounder guns. Between 1813 and 1830 she made nine voyages for the EIC. On 11 September 1832 her owners sold her to Dom Pedro, Pretender to the Portuguese throne, who converted her into a frigate. Taken back by her owners and reverted to a merchantman after the failure of his campaign. In 1855 she was sold for breaking up.

== See also ==
- Lord Wellington (ship)
