= Proby Cautley =

English engineer and palaeontologist

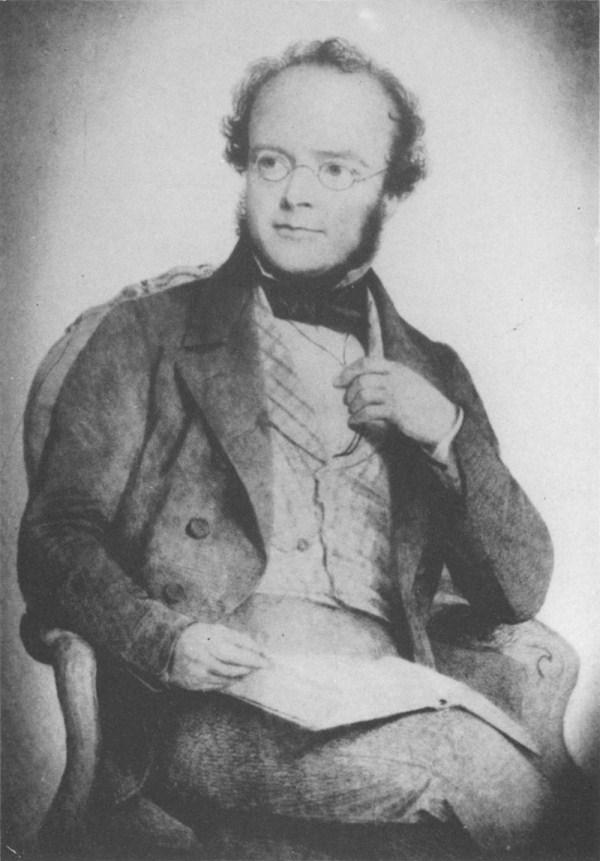
- Portrait of Proby Cautley
- Born: Proby Cautley; 3 January 1802
- Died: 25 January 1871 (aged 69)

Sir Proby Thomas Cautley, KCB (3 January 1802 – 25 January 1871), was an English engineer and palaeontologist who is best known for having conceived and supervised the construction of the Ganges Canal during East India Company rule in India. The canal stretches some 350 miles between its headworks at Haridwar and, after bifurcation near Aligarh, its confluences with the Ganges river mainstem in Kanpur and the Yamuna river in Etawah. At the time of completion, it had the greatest discharge of any irrigation canal in the world.

Proby Cautley was educated at Charterhouse School (1813–18), followed by the East India Company's Military Seminary at Addiscombe (1818–19). After less than a year, he was commissioned as a second lieutenant and dispatched to India, joining the Bengal Presidency artillery in Calcutta. In 1825, he assisted Captain Robert Smith, the engineer in charge of constructing the Eastern Yamuna canal, also called the Doab canal. He was in charge of this canal for 12 years between 1831 and 1843. By 1836, he had become Superintendent-General of Canals.

Cautley is also known for his research on fossils found in India, particularly those found in the Siwalik Hills, which he conducted in collaboration with Hugh Falconer. In 1846, he was made a fellow of the Royal Society for this work.

== Parents and childhood ==
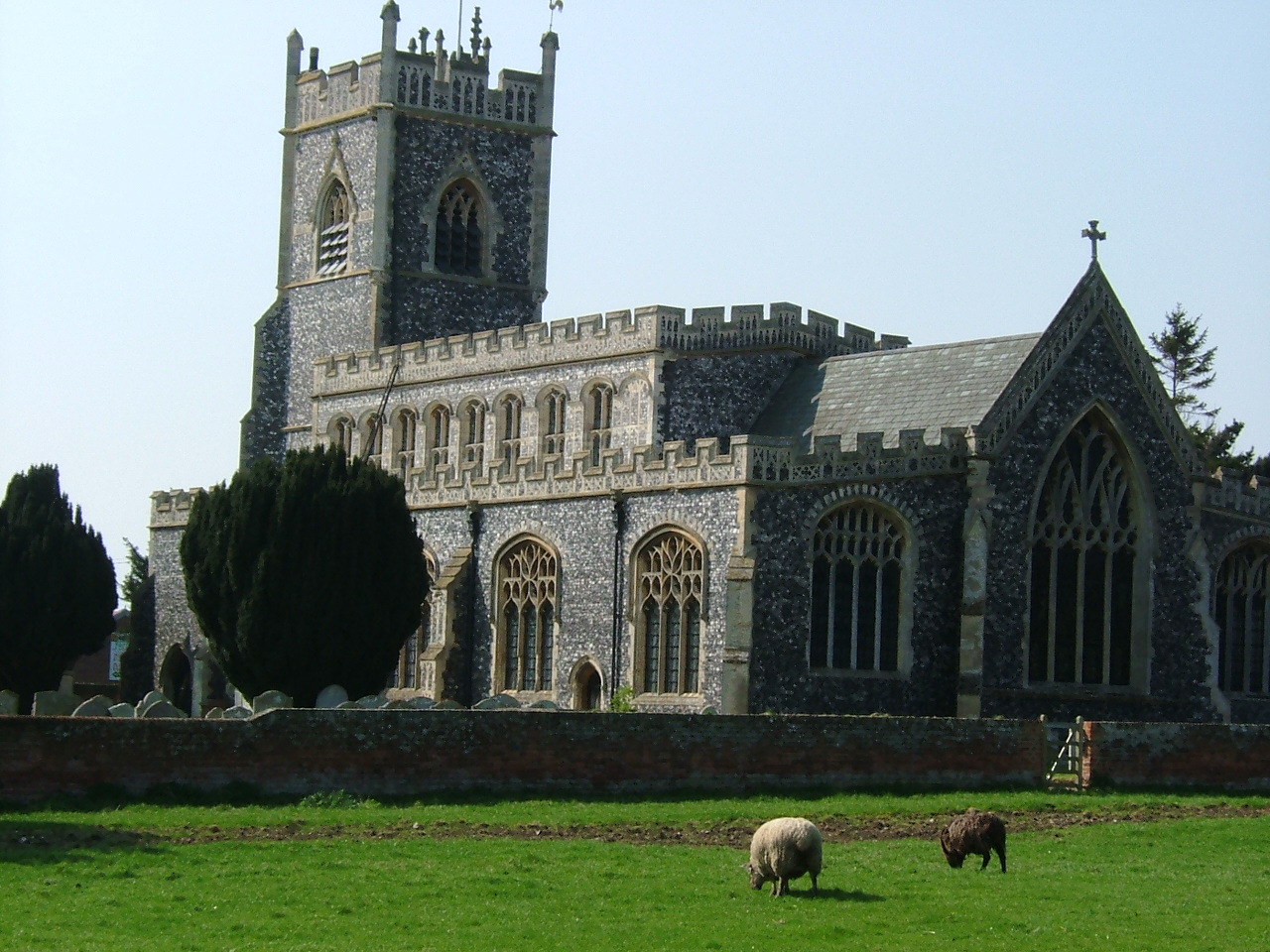
Stratford St. Mary church

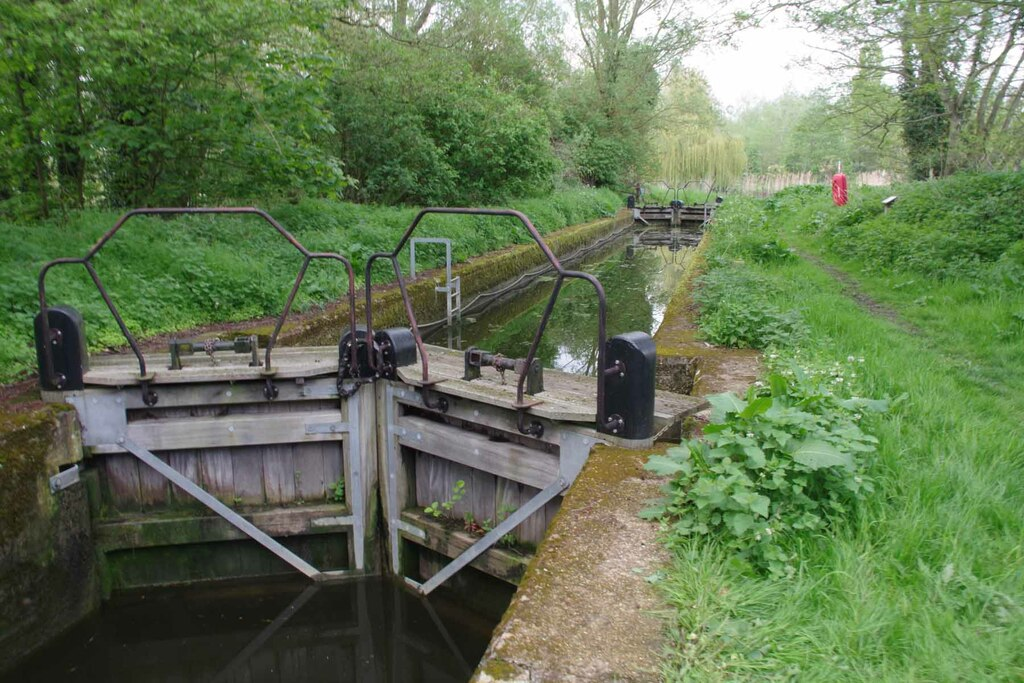
The lock on the River Stour in Stratford St. Mary

Proby Cautley was born in Raydon, Suffolk on 3 January 1802 to Catherine, née Proby (c. 1772–1830), and Thomas Cautley (c. 1756–1817). Proby Cautley's grandfathers on both sides were clergymen. His father, Thomas, was an erudite man who had spent most of his life at the University of Cambridge. Thomas had entered Trinity College in 1772. He was chosen Second Wrangler in the B. A. examination. He went on to receive the M.A. and B.D. degrees. After being elected a Fellow of Trinity College in 1778, he held various administrative positions at Cambridge until c. 1796.

In 1791, Thomas was granted a living and rectorship at Raydon, where, after his marriage and departure from Trinity, he took up residence. However, his wife died after the birth of the couple's second daughter. Eighteen months later, Thomas married Catherine, the second of eight daughters of the clergyman, Narcissus Charles Proby (1738/9–1804) in nearby Stratford St. Mary. Reverend Proby, who owned land in Stratford, Cheshire, and Ireland, was wealthy by what was typical for that time and place. Each daughter had a marriage settlement of £1,000. In 1803, the year following Proby Cautley's birth, Thomas Cautley combined his living with his father-in-law's. Upon Reverend Proby's death in December 1804, the Cautleys moved into the Stratford parsonage. Proby was the eldest surviving son; a year after him, a sister, Catherine Maria, was born, followed later by a brother George, and a second sister Arabella.

Supported by Thomas Cautley's two incomes, the family lived comfortably. The children were raised in an intellectually invigorating atmosphere. Their interests included painting, collecting plants in their natural environment, fossils, and reading. River Stour, which ran through Stratford, had a lock which survives. Later in life, George produced some books of verse. One poem dedicated to Proby on the occasion of the opening of the Ganges Canal in 1854, replayed childhood memories:

The garden brook, home of thy first essay,
The mimic sluice, and fairy waterwheel,
And those mild eyes which blest thy thoughtful play...

Thomas Cautley's health began to falter in 1807. He died on 13 July 1817 and was buried in Roydon church, where his first wife is also memorialised. Proby's brother George entered Pembroke College, Cambridge, in 1825 and became a clergyman, while his sisters remained at home with their mother until her death in June 1830. There are memorials to her and Proby's father in Stratford St Mary church. Proby's childhood was passed amidst a large family: his own family, and, living nearby, his grandmother Proby, his mother's seven sisters, and his cousins. This contrasted markedly with his life in India, where he was to arrive alone on a vast continent still shy of his 18th birthday.

== Education ==
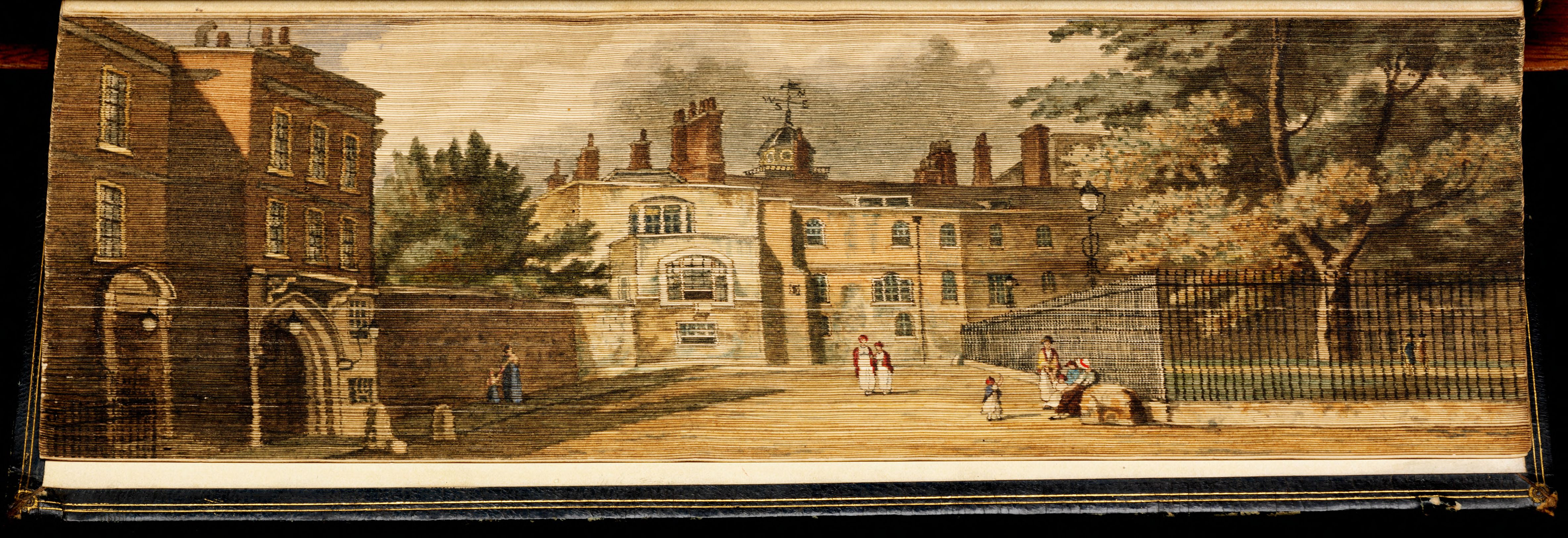
Charterhouse School, 1808, three years before Cautley's arrival there.

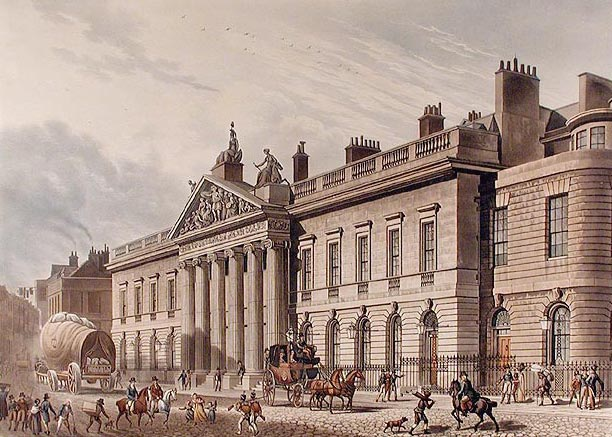
East India House c. 1817

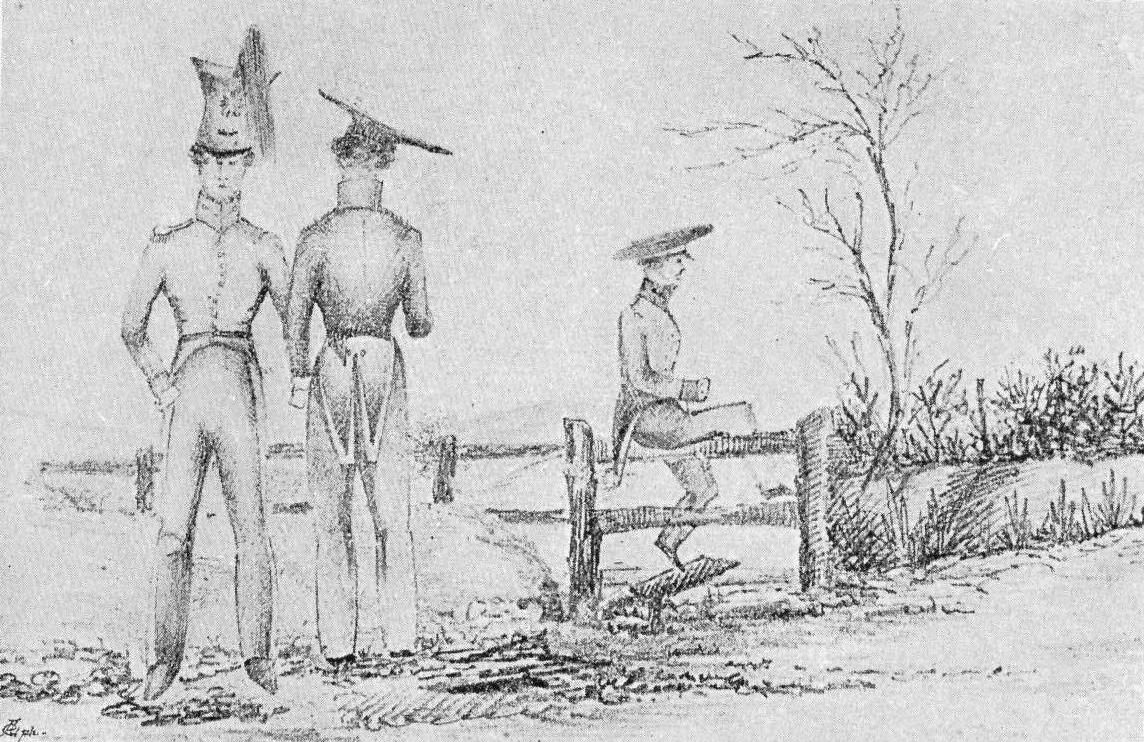
Addiscombe cadets sketched by a fellow cadet seven years after Cautley had left the college.

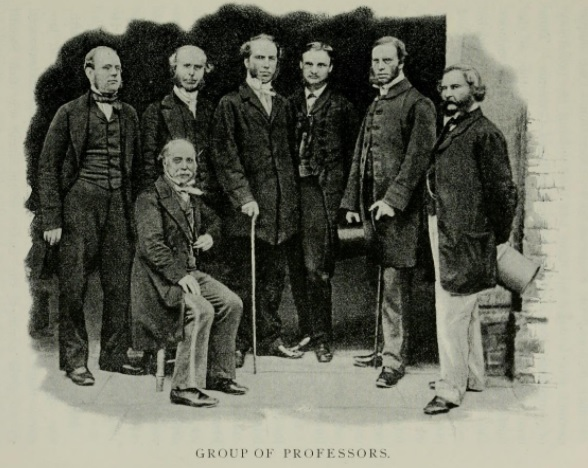
A group of professors at Addiscombe

Proby Cautley was sent away to boarding school at age 11, entering Charterhouse School in January 1813, and remaining a pupil there until July 1818. The school, founded in 1614 and not far from St Paul's School, London, had approximately 200 pupils. The annual fees was £80, putting the school outside the reach of all but the somewhat affluent. During that time, the headmaster was the Reverend John Russell, who was in office from 1811 until 1832.

Cautley's time at Charterhouse was very likely also passed under a system traditional in public schools, with the rule of monitors, fagging, corporal punishment, and an education made up mainly of Latin and Greek, with a bit of Mathematics. Charterhouse was an institution with a close and long-established association with military service in India during the period of East India Company rule there. A Charterhouse education was not uncommonly followed by further studies at the East India Company's Artillery and Engineers Seminary at Addiscombe.

A decision on a military career having been taken, Cautley was recommended sometime in 1817 by his uncle, Archibald Elijah Impey, to James Pattinson, who was on the Court of Directors of the Company, and authorised to nominate several boys annually to the Seminary. On 29 July 1818, Cautley was taken by his uncle to East India House, London, the headquarters of the Company, to apply for admission as a cadet to Addiscombe. Cautley furnished details of his date of birth and physical fitness. He and his uncle attested that the admission to Addiscombe was achieved without cost to the recipient.

Academic prerequisites for entering cadets included a firm foundation in arithmetic, including vulgar fractions, good handwriting, and proficiency in English- and Latin grammars. During Cautley's time at Addiscombe, Dr James Andrew was the Principal and Professor of Mathematics and Classics. There were seven other teachers. The annual fee of £30 was paid by the East India Company, as were other expenses, such as the weekly pocket money of 2s 6d. Cadets choosing not to proceed to India had to reimburse the Company for costs incurred.

The cadet's uniform during Cautley's time consisted of a single-breasted coatee made of blue cloth with a red collar and cuffs, and the tail cut and folded back to expose a red lining. The trousers were also made of blue fabric with red stripes running down the outer seams. The headwear consisted of a "bell-top" shako—which flared outwards towards the top; it was made of black beaver fur, and fitted with a white plume.

A Public Examination at Addiscombe, a formal assessment in which cadets gave evidence of mastery of pre-disclosed questions, was held twice a year. A public examiner attended it. During Cautley's stay, the public examiner was Col. William Mudge, who had led the trigonometrical survey of Great Britain. Cautley's public examination was held on 6 April 1819; his stay at Addiscombe was less than a full year. It was thought that he may have been rushed through on account of a pressing call for artillerymen from India. Some students who were not quite 16, were also allowed to leave for India, a fact lamented in Col Mudge's report on the examination. Cautley received a prize for drawing; it was a copy of Edward Edwards' Perspective.

== Military career in India, 1819–1825 ==
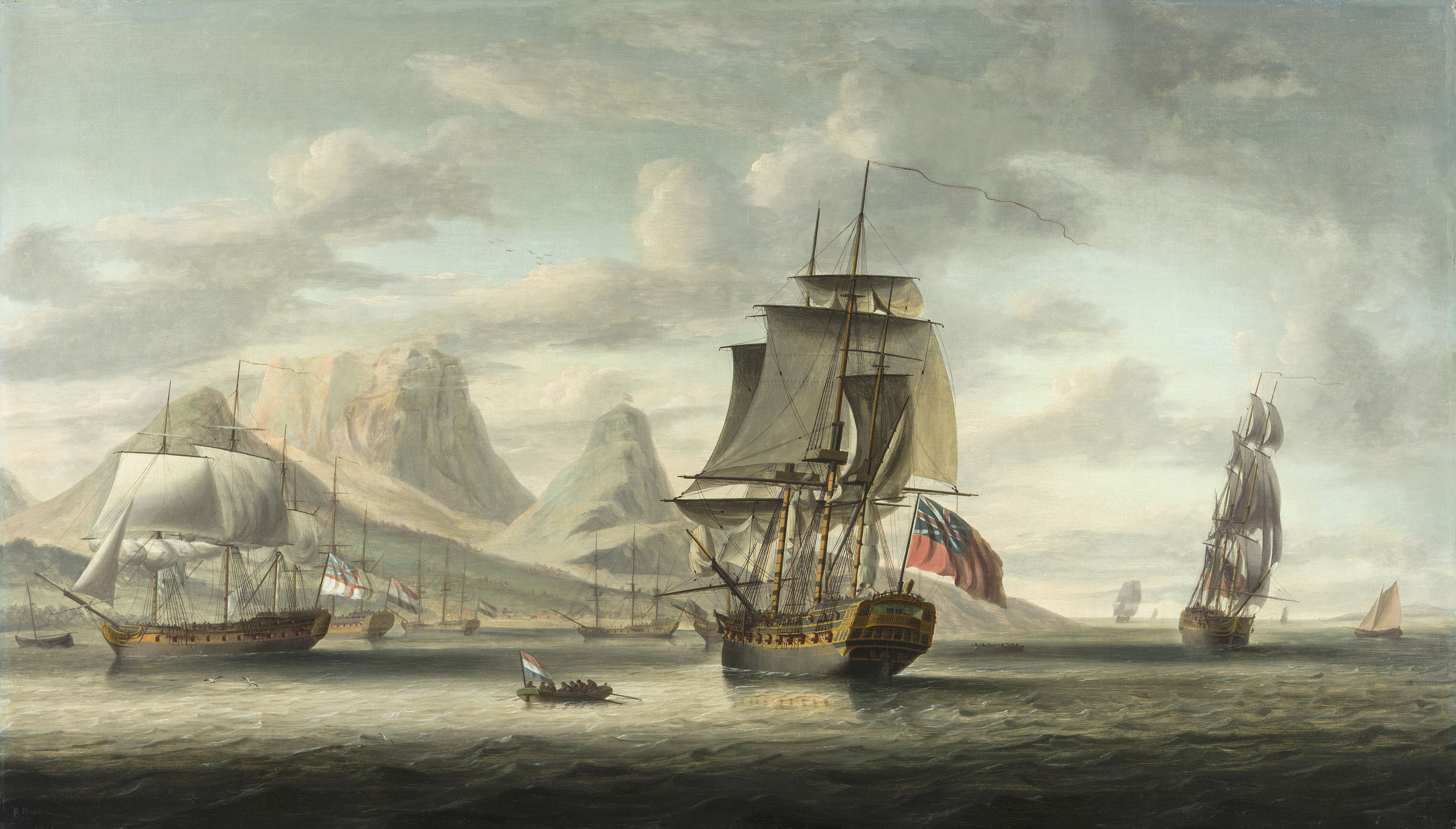
British and Dutch vessels rounding the Cape of Good Hope in the late 18th century

A newly arrived East India Company civil servant being carried ashore in Calcutta, 1822

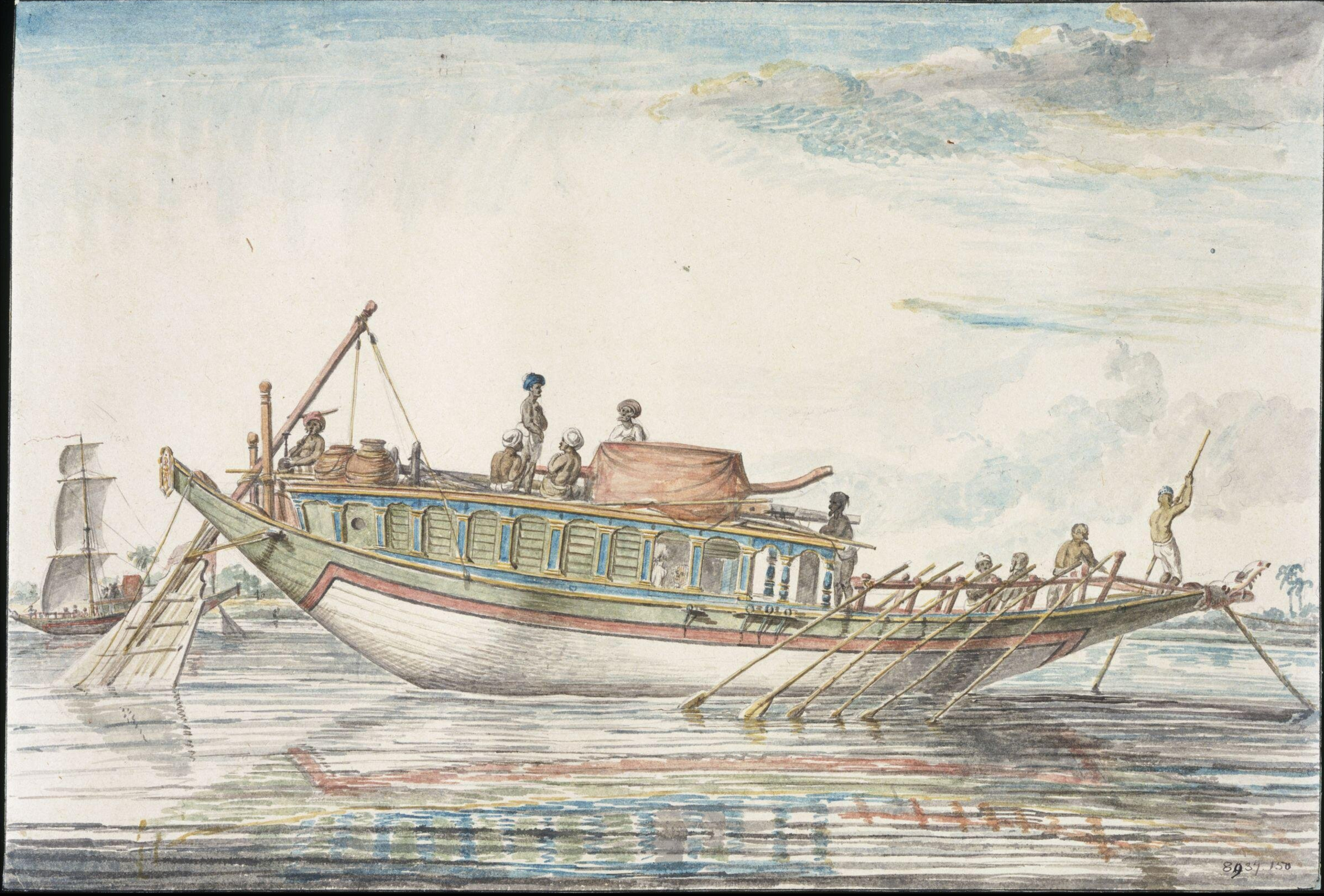
A budgerow from a late 18th-century drawing

1823 map of India, with British-administered areas shown in pink

On 19 April 1819 Cautley was commissioned as a second lieutenant. His passage to India was assigned on Marquis of Wellington, an East India Company vessel laid down in 1811. Very likely, it is what Cautley boarded at the Downs on 23 May 1819. An older ship with the same name was wrecked in 1818. The ship's fare amounted to between £55 and £95, depending on whether the newly-commissioned cadets ate with third mates in their mess or at the officers' dining table. An additional £15 had to be paid to the ship's owners.

A £95 payment guaranteed only accommodations in steerage. Sharing a cabin with another cadet, considered the best choice for an ensign like Cautley, cost more. As a cadet's salary and allowances did not commence until he arrived in India, he required a £100 letter of credit for purchasing the regimental uniform in India. Travelling with a uniform purchased in England was discouraged as the sea air often tarnished the gold or silver trimmings.

In 1819 the journey to India proceeded around the Cape of Good Hope and took four to six months. It was several decades before a feasible route over land via Cairo became available, and several decades more before the Suez Canal was opened in 1869. Once a ship docked in Diamond Harbour, 90 miles below Calcutta at the mouth of the Hooghly River, the cadets had to hire boats to take them and their luggage upriver to Fort William.

A newly-arrived cadet was advised to present his credentials without delay to the fort-major, the officer next in rank to the commandant, to set the start date for his salary. He was given living accommodations in Fort William, and the head-servant of the barracks supplied furniture and advice on acquiring personal servants. Three or four weeks could be approved for acquiring uniforms and making arrangements to proceed to one's army unit in the interior of the country. Cautley reached Calcutta (now Kolkata) on 11 September 1819, and was inducted into military service.

The journey up country was often made in a budgerow, a single- or double-masted decked boat, fitted with ten or 12 oars, and room for two passengers and their luggage. The transit up the Ganges could take two to six months, the latter duration once recorded for a fleet of boats in 1833. The mortality rate among newly-commissioned cadets from departure from England to arrival at the army unit in India was 8%. The causes were deaths at sea, tropical diseases, or sudden squalls during the river journey.

Upon arrival at his regiment, the cadet was encouraged to hire household staff, whose combined monthly salaries, together with expenses in the regimental mess, could amount to Rupees 60 (a rupee being 2s 6d at par in 1820). However, two ensigns sharing a bungalow and household staff could manage each on Rupees 40. The requisite horse and groom cost an additional 16 rupees monthly per person. As an ensign's monthly salary and allowances totalled 200 rupees, he could live comfortably on half that amount. Still, money needed to be set aside strategically. If the need for sick leave arose, the Company paid for the journey home but not the return. Three-year furloughs were not granted until after the tenth year, and officers received only two and a half years' salary. The custom of purchasing "steps" among junior officers also made savings essential. To facilitate their collective advancement up the seniority ladder, they raised money for senior officers to induce them to retire.

During his first two years in India, Cautley was stationed in the Presidency of Fort William, or the Bengal presidency. He moved successively—according to army records—to Rajputana in 1821, Cawnpore in 1822, and Agra in 1823–1824. He spent his time in artillery duties, such as the reducing forts in the Oudh State.

Early in 1825, Cautley was sent to the Himalayan foothills to assist in the comprehensive overhaul of the Doab Canal, also known as the Eastern Jumna (now Yamuna) Canal. Except for a single reassignment to military duty later that year, he was to work in hydraulic engineering for the rest of his years in India.

The recall to his artillery regiment involved the Siege of Bharatpur in 1825–1826. This was the second time the Company's army had laid siege there. After taking the fort in 1808, it had placed the kingdom in the hands of a friendly Indian prince. His infant successor, however, was overthrown in March 1825 in apparent disregard of British authority. To remedy the state of affairs, Lord Combermere, Commander-in-Chief of the Army in India, marched to Bharatpur with 30,500 men. They laid siege to the fort between 9 December 1825 and 18 January 1826. Cautley's regiment suffered light casualties but took in substantial spoils. Cautley and other canal officers participated. Years later, he recounted how, after he had dozed off at his post—burdened by the long watch—a sudden silence, brought on by the ending of the cannonade, awakened him to the British victory.

== Doab Canal ==
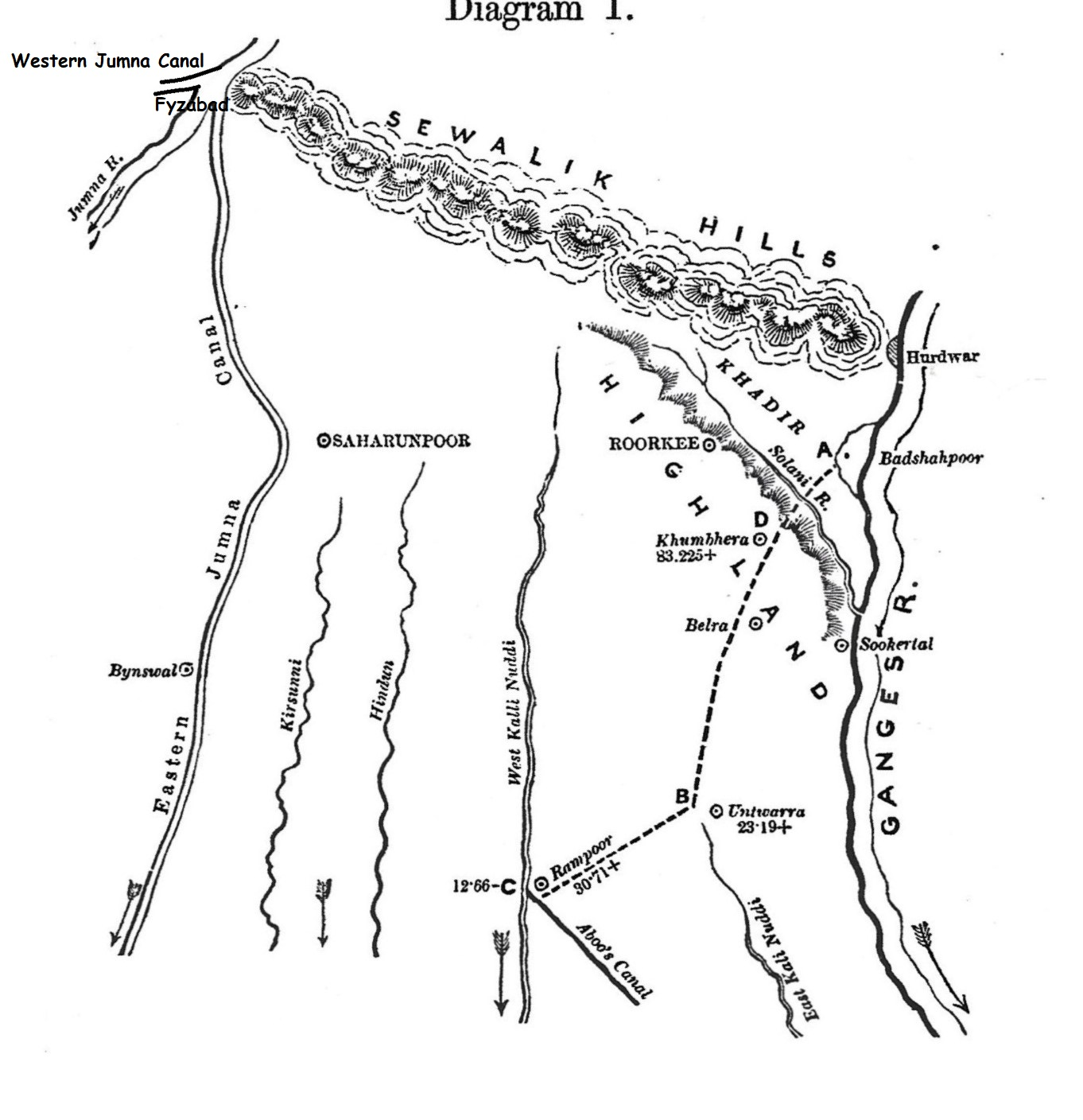
The Eastern Jumna (now Yamuna) Canal, also Doab Canal, taking off from the Yamuna River in the vicinity of Faizabad, a village near the Sivalik Hills in Saharanpur district, Uttar Pradesh

The Doab Canal was one of two old Mughul era canals which took off (i.e. split off) at nearly opposite points high up in the course of the River Jumna (Yamuna), a right bank tributary of the Ganges river. The Western Jumna Canal was begun in the 14th century. The canal was lengthened in the 17th century. The eastern canal, also called the Doab Canal, was constructed at this time. However, a lack of maintenance had made both unusable by the mid-18th century. The eastern canal had very likely never functioned efficiently because of its steep slope. Cautley joined Captain Robert Smith, who had begun work on the eastern canal two years earlier. The canal ran for 140 miles over varying and challenging terrain. Cautley and Smith cleared the bed and erected masonry bridges, sluices, and dams. The Doab canal was formally opened in 1830. Smith, thereafter, returned to Europe, and Cautley took over managing the canal during its first months. Cautley was appointed superintendent in 1831. He was directly responsible for the Doab Canal until 1843, remaining nominally in control afterwards as superintendent of canals in the North-Western Provinces. Between 1837 and 1841, he designed several smaller canals in the Dehra Dun region, which served as important sources of irrigation and drinking water.

== Fossil work ==
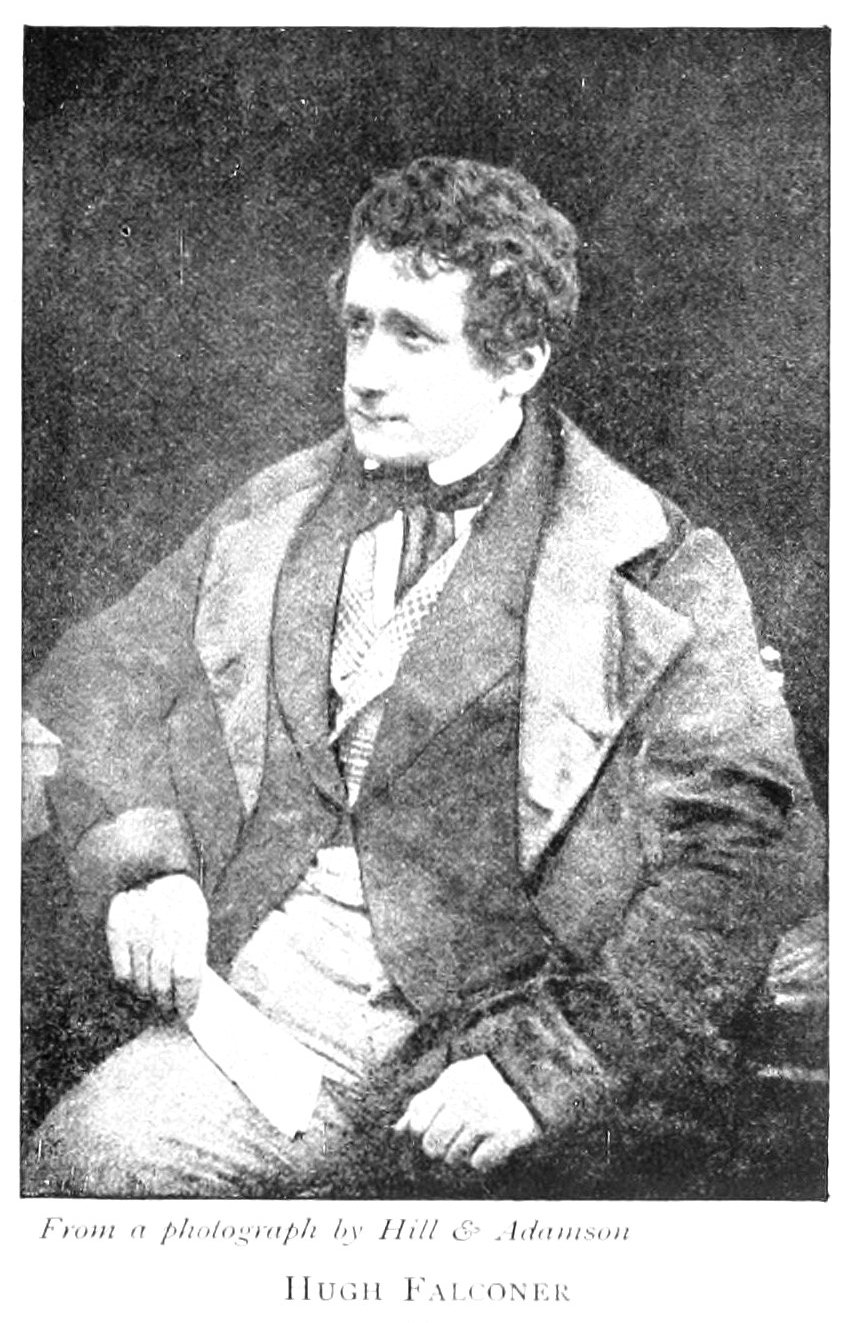
Hugh Falconer in 1844

Hugh Falconer was a Scottish surgeon in the Bengal Presidency of the East India Company. His avocation, the enthusiastic pursuit of geological topics, especially fossils, had led to his appointment as superintendent of the Company's botanical gardens in Saharanpur, then in the Ceded and Conquered Provinces of the western Presidency. Cautley, who was living nearby at the time, was also interested in the topic. In 1832 a new aspect was added to Cautley's career through his friendship with Falconer. The two soon began to mount expeditions into the nearby Siwalik hills, where they hoped animal fossils would be found in the tertiary rock layers. Cautley's other friends and assistants took part in the expeditions. Controlled use of explosives uncovered an abundant fauna of great variety, consisting of animals, birds, reptiles, and fish, many in excellent condition. After they were carefully measured and illustrated in drawings, the most significant results were published in Indian and British journals. Recognition soon followed: the Geological Society of London awarded its 1837 Wollaston medal to Falconer and Cautley. The two offered to donate their large collection to the Society, which, however, was constrained by a lack of space. Cautley ultimately induced the British Museum to accept and pay for the shipment of well over 200 cases, which he had packed himself.

== Marriage ==
At Landour, in the foothills of the Himalayas, Cautley was married to Frances Bacon on 20 September 1838. The bride was the third daughter of Anthony Bacon of Saharanpur. Walter George Cautley, their only child, was born on 30 July 1840. Early in 1843, Frances, who had begun to worry about the child's health, left with him for England.

== Ganges Canal I ==
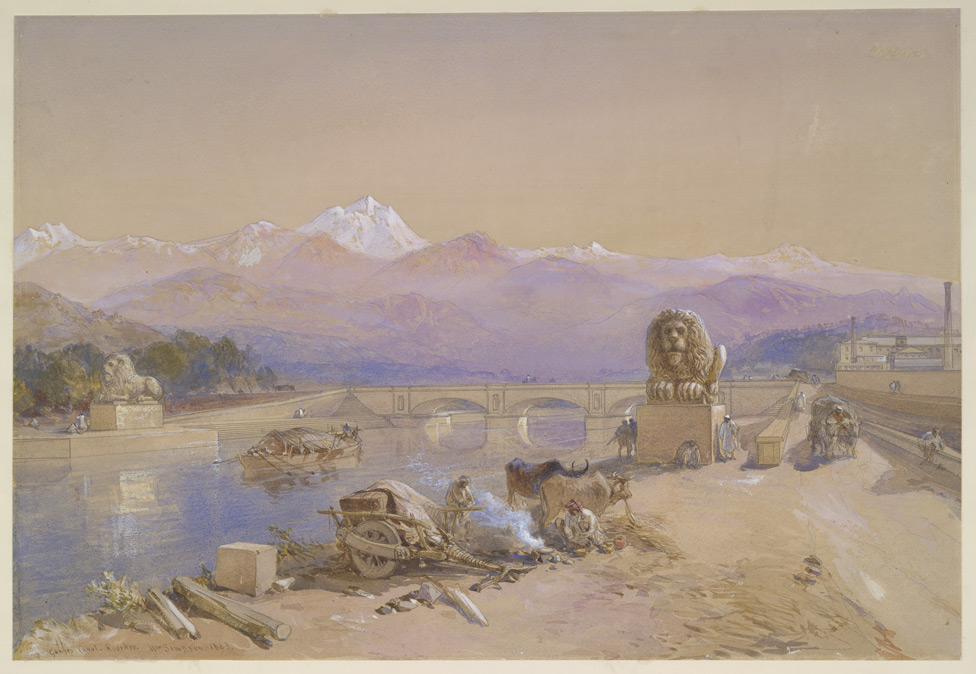
The bridge over the Ganges Canal in Roorkee. Oil on canvas, 1860, by William Simpson, 1823–1899

Planning for Cautley's major project, the Ganges Canal, had begun in 1836. The proposed canal took off from the Ganges' right bank a short distance above Hardwar (now Haridwar), where the river debouches onto the plains of northern India. It flowed past Roorkee and down the upper Doab, the interfluve between the Ganges and its major tributary, the Yamuna River. At Nanu (now Nanau), a small village near Aligarh, the canal split, its left branch rejoining the Ganges near Cawnpore (now Kanpur) and the right meeting the Jumna, near Farrukhabad. The original proposal was for a canal channel of 255 miles and branch lines of 73 miles, but the proposal was modified during construction.

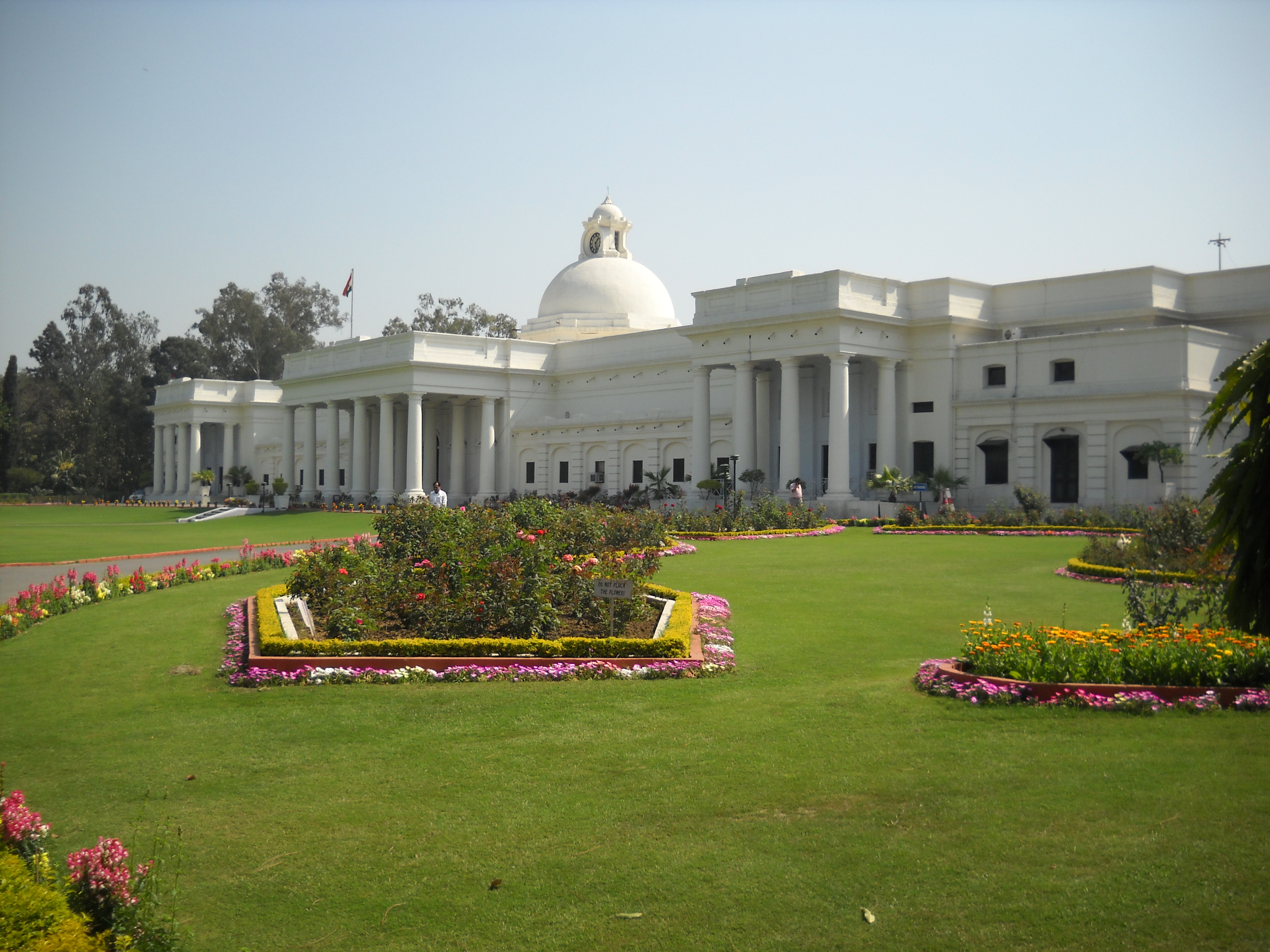
The main building of the first engineering college in India, the Thomason College of Civil Engineering, Roorkee, founded in 1847, which grew into the University of Roorkee, founded in 1949, and was renamed Indian Institute of Technology, Roorkee in 2001.

The project was sanctioned by the East India Company in 1841, but work did not begin until 1843. Much of the work of making the canal bed level, and also the abutting land, was carried out by Cautley himself. He designed and directed the building of all structures. At the outset, the work proceeded slowly, a reflection of the government's insufficient enthusiasm for the project and the allocation of funds. (Cautley found himself hampered in execution by the Governor-General, Lord Ellenborough.) Cautley had few trained British assistants; his force of Indian labourers had few mechanical aids other than brick-making machines and a tramway running along the excavated portion of the canal. Cautley's efforts to obtain well-trained assistants eventually bore fruit in the establishment of a college of engineering in Roorkee by James Thomason, the Lieutenant-Governor of the North-Western Provinces, in 1847; it was the first engineering college in India. In 1854, after the completion of the canal and Thomason's death, Cautley renamed it the Thomason College of Civil Engineering. Cautley also established the Cautley gold medal, awarded annually to the best student in mathematics.

(Initially, Cautley was opposed by the Hindu priests at Haridwar, who felt that the waters of the holy river Ganges would be imprisoned; but Cautley pacified them by agreeing to leave a gap in the dam from where the water could flow unchecked. He further appeased the priests by undertaking the repair of bathing ghats along the river. He also inaugurated the dam by the worship of Lord Ganesh, the god of good beginnings. Construction of the dam faced many complications, including the problem of the mountainous streams that threatened the canal. Near Roorkee, the land fell away sharply and Cautley had to build an aqueduct to carry the canal for half a kilometre. As a result, at Roorkee the canal is 25 metres higher than the original river. From 1845 to 1848 he was absent in England owing to ill-health, and on his return to India he was appointed director of canals in the North-Western Provinces. When the canal formally opened on 8 April 1854, its main channel was 348 miles (560 km) long, its branches 306 miles (492 km) long and the various tributaries over 3,000 miles (4,800 km) long. Over 767,000 acres (3,100 km^{2}) in 5,000 villages were irrigated.)

== Furlough and end of marriage ==
Cautley took a three-year furlough in England in 1845. Upon arriving in London in October, he discovered his wife, Frances, was having an affair with an army officer. The affair was to result in the birth of twins in July 1846. Cautley felt bound to pursue the time-consuming and costly action of obtaining a mensa et thoro separation in the consistory court. In 1850 he received a complete divorce from Frances by a private act of parliament. To add to his distress, his biological son, Walter George, died in October 1846.

== Ganges Canal II ==
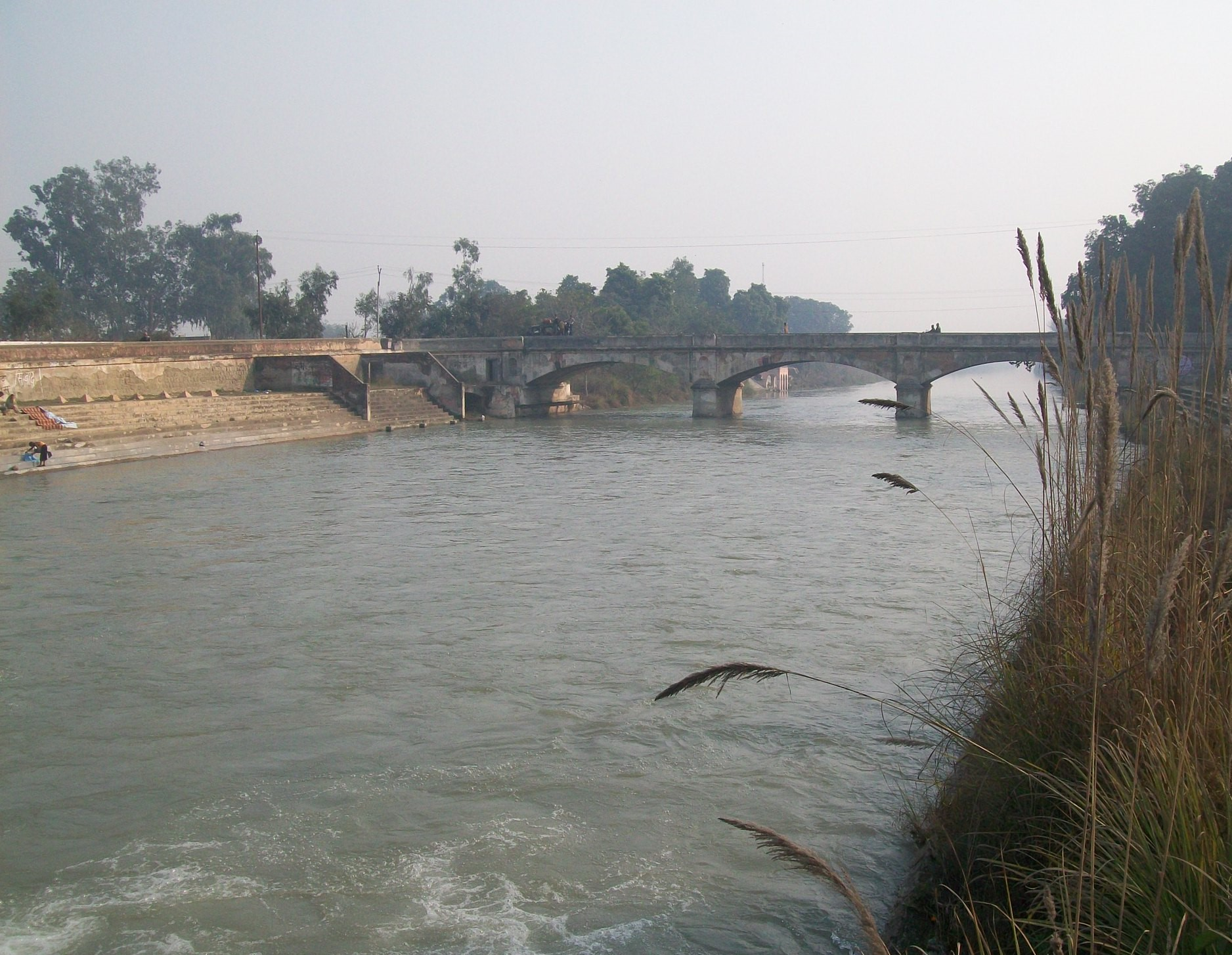
The bridge across the Ganges Canal at Walipura, Uttar Pradesh

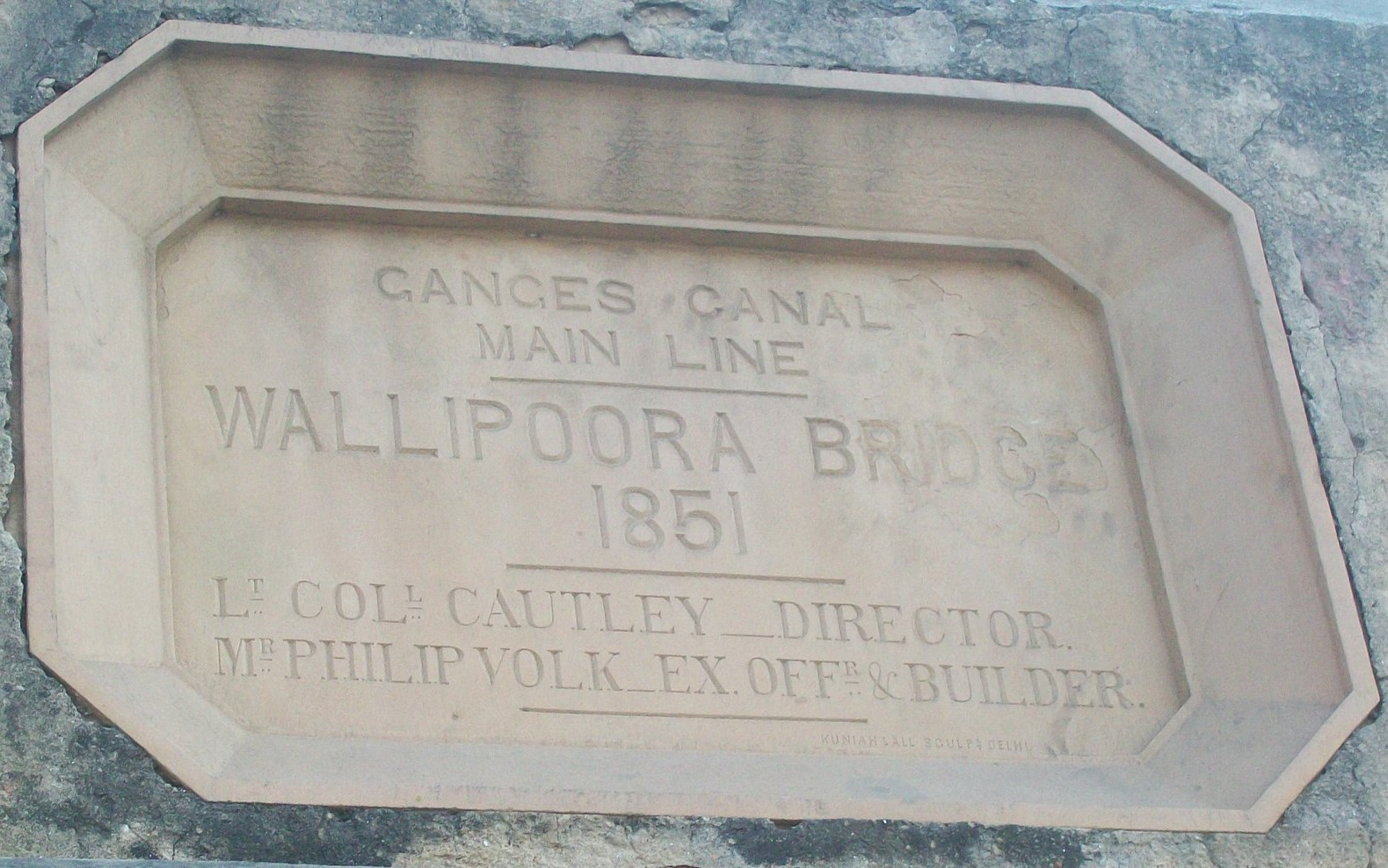
The 1851 plaque on the Walipura bridge bears Cautley's name

For his work in palaeontology and on the Ganges Canal, Cautley was elected Fellow of the Royal Society on 2 April 1846. During his return journey to India after his furlough, he stopped in northern Italy to observe its celebrated canals, though nothing he saw matched in scale what he was attempting in India. His next stop was in Egypt to observe the barrage works under construction at the head of the Nile Delta. He arrived ashore in Bombay in December 1947.

According to author Anita McConnell,

In April 1854 all was ready for the grand opening of the Ganges Canal. Vast crowds gathered and, amid much formal and informal celebration, Cautley led the official party to the steps at the top of the aqueduct where Lieutenant-Governor John Russell Colvin undid the first of the levers that kept the canal gates closed. All the gates were then opened, releasing the water to the strains of the national anthem and gunfire salvoes. Entertainment and speeches continued long into the night. It was a fitting end to Cautley's service and he was permitted to retire with effect from May 1854. News of the canal's opening had been transmitted by the new electric telegraph to Calcutta and, exceptionally, Cautley was given a thirteen-gun salute as his boat passed the ramparts of Fort William on the way to join the vessel that would transport him, with the various gifts that had been voted to him in Calcutta, to England. A knighthood was conferred on him on 29 July 1854, and in November that year he was raised to the honorary rank of colonel.

== Retirement and controversy ==
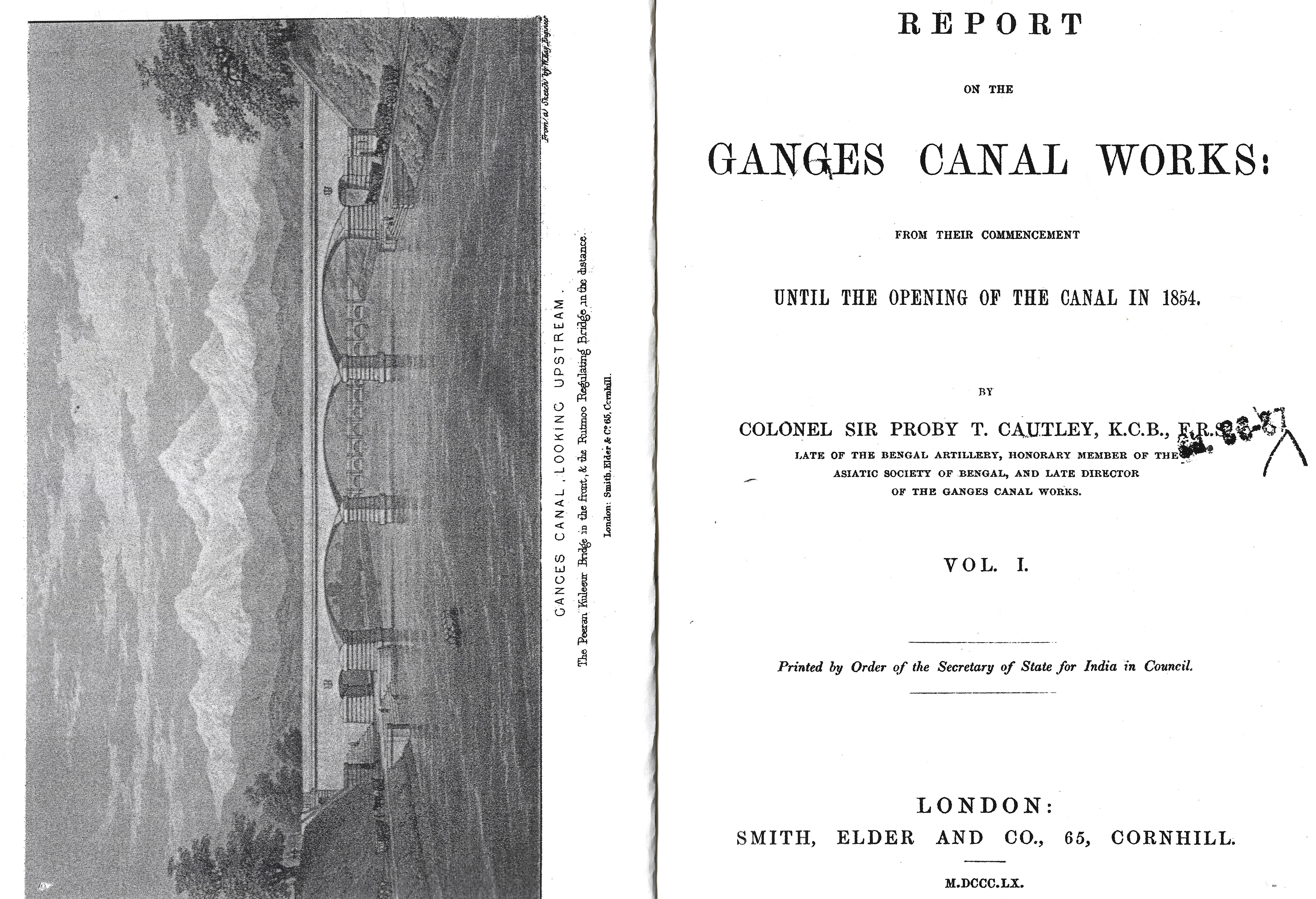
Title page and frontispiece of Cautley's Report on the Ganges Canal Works, volume I, Smith, Elder and Co., London, 1860

After the suppression of the Indian rebellion of 1857, the British parliament enacted the Government of India Act 1858, transferring the administration of British India from the East India Company to the Crown. Power was exercised in London by a Secretary of State for India in Council. Cautley was one of the first appointed members of the council of 15. Cautley did not consider it a position with an attached stipend but little responsibility; he took on committee work and attended weekly meetings. In 1860, he published the three-volume Report on the Ganges Canal Works.

In 1863, a private company, the East India Irrigation Company, sought to purchase the Ganges Canal from the government. It tasked Sir Arthur Cotton, the designer of several irrigation projects in the Madras Presidency in South India, who in retirement was on the rolls of the company, to report on the Ganges Canal. Cautley was drawn into a controversy about the defects in the Ganges Canal system that Cotton, a trenchant critic, seemed to have enumerated. Cautley accepted some weaknesses in the design but rejected most other criticisms. Cautley and Cotton, and their supporters, argued back and forth in privately printed pamphlets and very publicly in The Times. Finally, the remedies proposed by Captain James Crofton of the Government's irrigation department were accepted by both parties. In a few years, the matter came to a rest.

== Last years ==
In his remaining years, Cautley participated actively in London's social life. He was a member of the Athenaeum and kept a seat at the opera. From 1855 to 1857, he served on the council of the Geological Society of London. On 11 February 1865, he married again at St John's Wood. His bride was Julia Susannah Richards (1831/2–1916), who had a son and a daughter from a previous marriage. Cautley adopted the daughter, a toddler, and gave her his last name.

Cautley suffered from asthma and bronchitis. He died at home after a short illness on 25 January 1871.

== Honour ==
The plant genus Cautleya is named in his honour.

== Works ==
- Cautley, Proby T. (1860). Report on the Ganges Canal Works: from their commencement until the opening of the Canal in 1854. London: Smith, Elder. (2 vols.)
- Cautley, Proby Thomas (1864). Ganges canal: a disquisition on the heads of the Ganges of Jumna canals, North-western Provinces. London.
