= Budgerow =

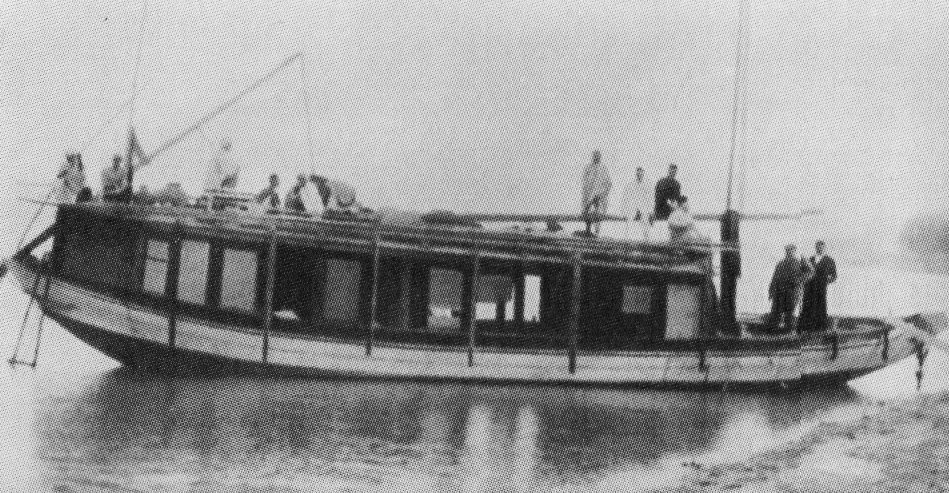
The Budgerow ("Bajra") of Rabindranath Tagore's family, named the "Padma"

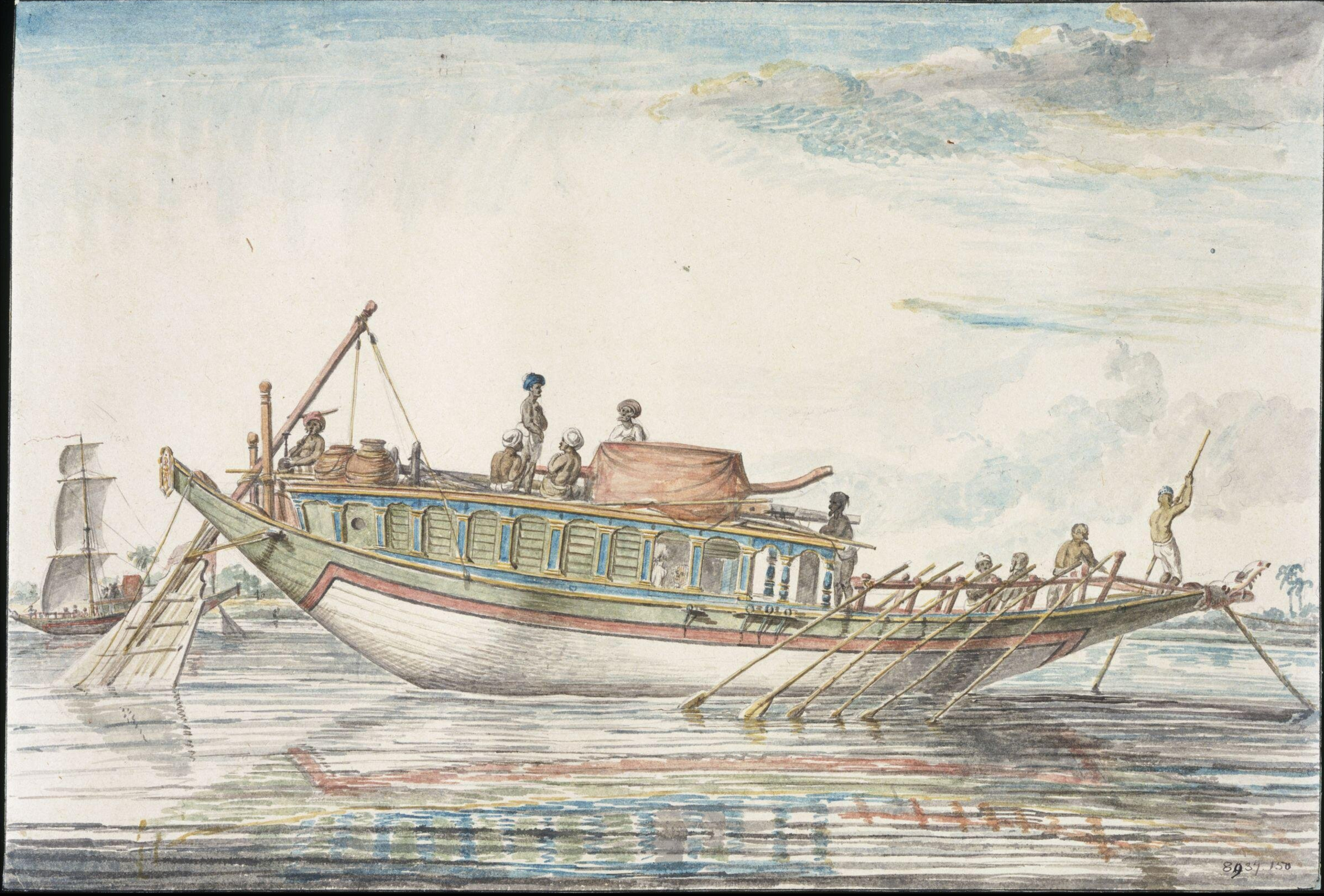
A budgerow, late 18th century, drawing by Frans Balthazar Solvyns

Budgerows were 'large and commodious, but generally cumbrous and sluggish keelless boats, used for journeys on the Ganges'. The term is thought to be an Anglicisation of the Hindi and Bengali word bajrā possibly derived from baglā or Arabic bagara.

== Structure of the boat ==
Budgerows were large boats with long cabins that ran the length of the boat. These were divided into separate compartments by means of partitions to serve as sleeping rooms, dining rooms and sitting rooms. These boat had rooms for servants and the boatmen who served on the vessel. The rudder at the stern of these boats were guided by helmsmen while goleers stationed at the bow ascertained the depth of water in the river by using a long pole.

When sailing, budgerows had a smaller baggage boat, called a pulwah, accompanying them carrying provisions, servants and facilities for cooking. A dinghy or paunchway was used as the means of communication between the boats and to dispatch messages to the shore as the budgerows cannot often come near the shores for absence of draft. Budgerows also had sails to drive them along in favourable weather. Budgerows were extremely slow and cumbersome, covering no more than 17 to 20 miles a day. They move faster when powered by sails and inclement winds required them to be towed by a crew of 16 or more men.

Before the arrival of the railways, the transport of goods across much of Northern India depended on rivers and budgerows were a common sight. They were owned mostly by the Indian aristocracy and by the better off Englishmen in India.
