= Henry Marshall Steven =

Henry Marshall Steven CBE FRSE (June 24, 1893 – February 19, 1969) was a 20th-century Scottish forester and academic. He was Editor of "Forestry" magazine from 1926 to 1946.

== Life ==
Steven was born in West Lothian, the son of Mary and Robert Steven. He was educated at Bathgate School. He studied science at the University of Edinburgh graduating with a BSc in 1915. In 1917 he was appointed as Statistics Officer for the Timber Supply Department for the remainder of the World War I. After the war he resumed studies and gained a doctorate (PhD) from the University of Edinburgh in 1921. He then began working as a Research Officer for the newly created Forestry Commission. In 1930 he became Head of the East England division and in 1933 Head of East Scotland division.

In 1938 he became Professor of Forestry at the University of Aberdeen. He remained in this role until he retired in 1963.

In 1937 he was elected a Fellow of the Royal Society of Edinburgh. His proposers were Sir William Wright Smith, Sir John Donald Sutherland, John Macqueen Cowan and Matthew Young Orr. In 1959 he was created a Commander of the Order of the British Empire. In 1964 the University of Aberdeen awarded him an honorary doctorate (LLD).

He died in Aberdeen following a long illness.

== Family ==
In 1922 he married Clementina Macdonald Findlay and together they had three sons.

== Publications ==
- Forestry (1931) six volumes
- The Forests and Forestry of Scotland (1951)
- The Native Pinewoods of Scotland (1959, with A. Carlisle)
