= Matthew Young Orr =

British botanist

Matthew Young Orr FRSE (1883-1953) was a 20th-century British botanist and a specialist on conifers.

== Life ==
Orr studied Botany at University College, Cardiff. From 1906 to 1913 he lectured in botany at the University of Cardiff. In 1913, he moved to Edinburgh to oversee the Royal Botanic Gardens.

In the First World War he served as a lieutenant in the 7th battalion Royal Scots in Gallipoli and Palestine. He was later promoted to captain.

He returned to the Royal Botanic Gardens after the war and worked under William Wright Smith. He later worked with both John Macqueen Cowan and Roland Edgar Cooper.

In 1932, he was elected a Fellow of the Royal Society of Edinburgh. His proposers were Sir William Wright Smith, Malcolm Wilson, John Macqueen Cowan, and Alexander Nelson.

He died on 9 September 1953.
