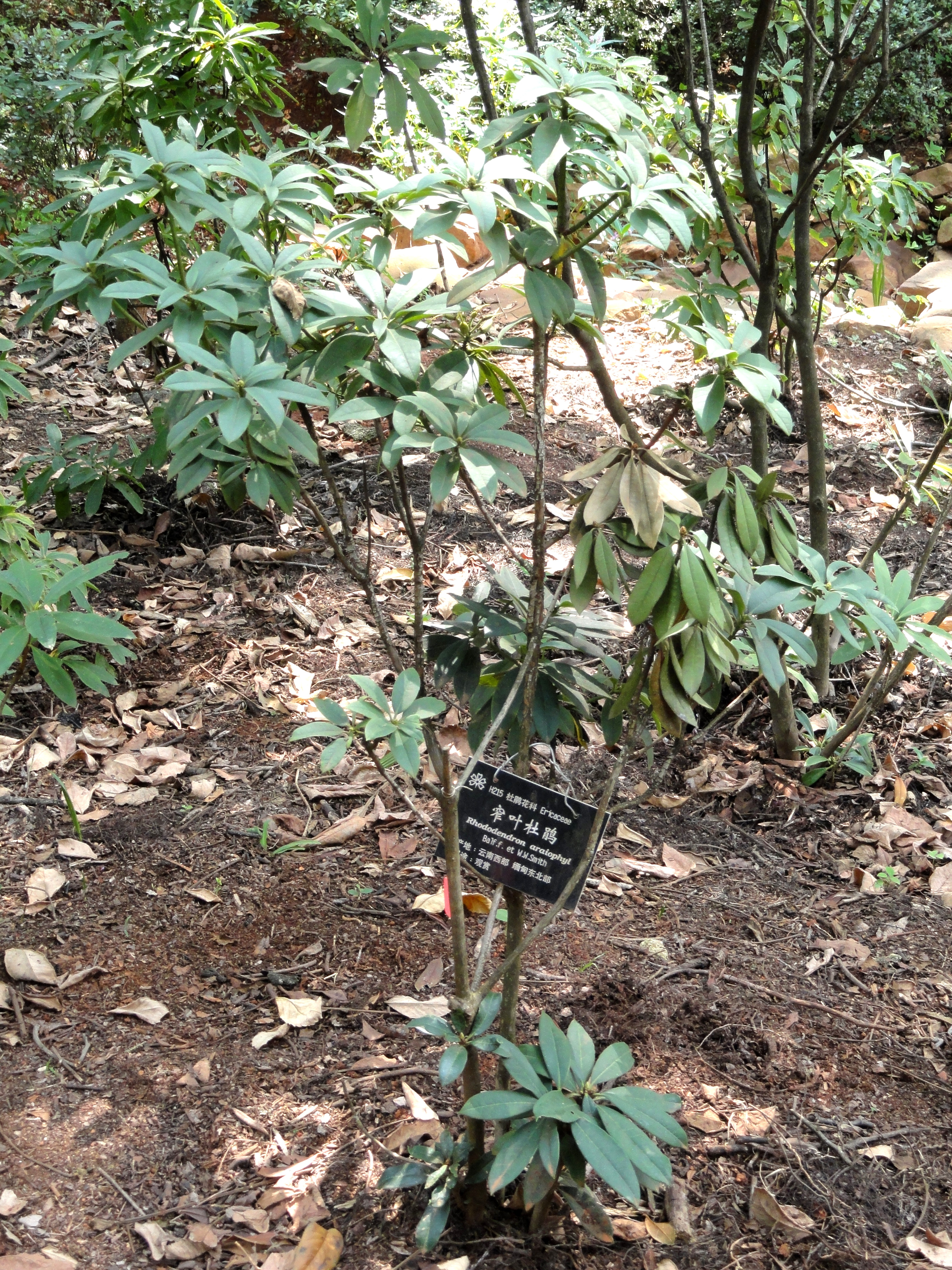

Scientific classification
- Kingdom: Plantae
- Clade: Tracheophytes
- Clade: Angiosperms
- Clade: Eudicots
- Clade: Asterids
- Order: Ericales
- Family: Ericaceae
- Genus: Rhododendron
- Species: R. araiophyllum

Binomial name
- Rhododendron araiophyllum Balf.f. & W.W.Sm.

= Rhododendron araiophyllum =

Species of plant

Rhododendron araiophyllum (窄叶杜鹃) is a flowering plant in the Ericaceae family, native to western Yunnan, northern Myanmar and northern Vietnam. It grows at altitudes of 1900–3400 meters. It is a shrub that grows to 1–4 m in height, with leathery leaves that are elliptic-lanceolate or narrowly lanceolate, 5–11 by 1.3–3 cm in size. Flowers are predominantly white.

== Subspecies ==
As of February 2024, Plants of the World Online accepted two subspecies:

- Rhododendron araiophyllum subsp. araiophyllum
- Rhododendron araiophyllum subsp. lapidosum (T.L.Ming) M.Y.Fang

== Sources ==
- "Rhododendron araiophyllum", I. B. Balfour & W. W. Smith, Trans. Bot. Soc. Edinburgh. 27: 184. 1917.
- Flora of China
- Hirsutum.com
