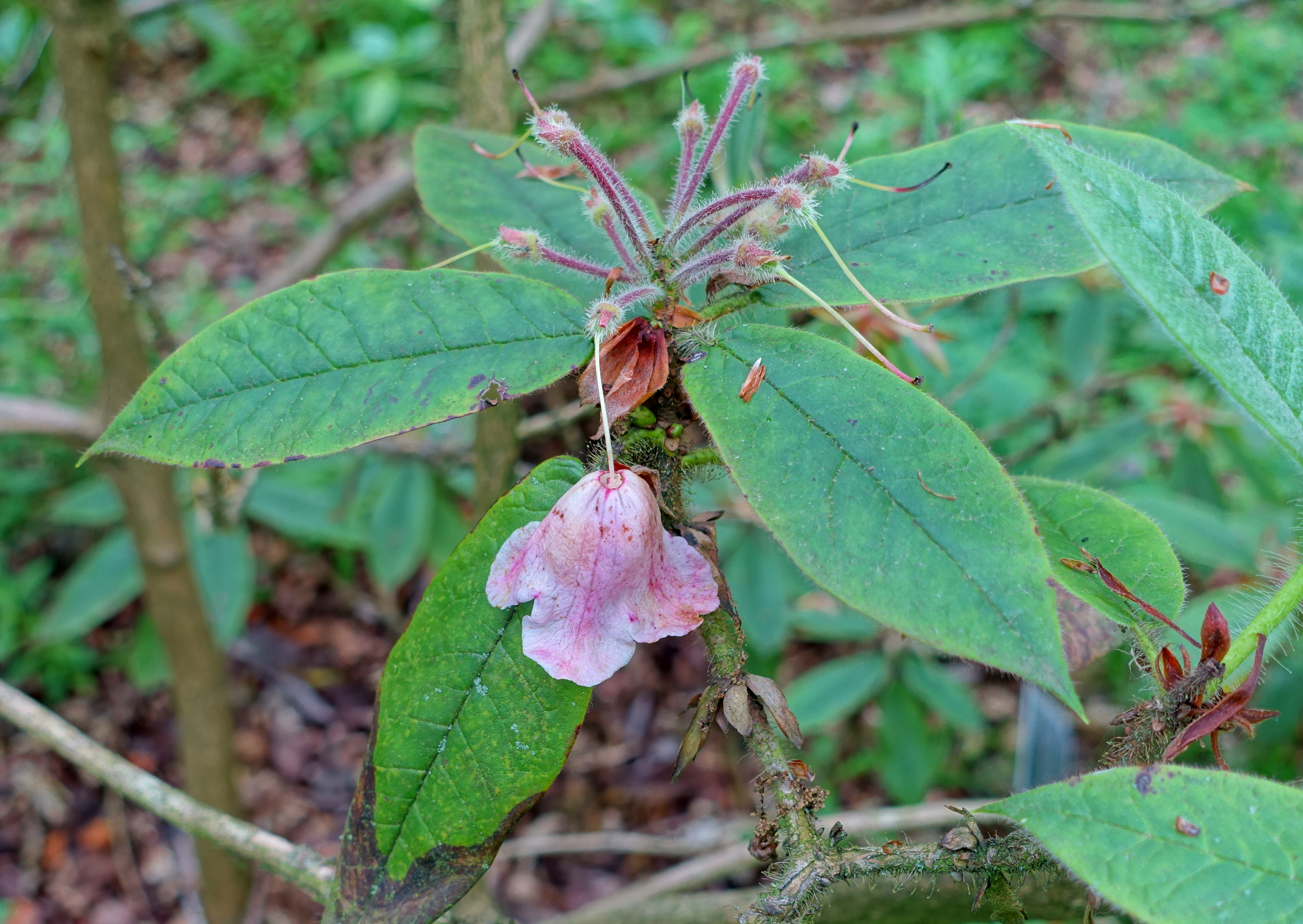
- Rhododendron glischrum subsp. rude

Scientific classification
- Kingdom: Plantae
- Clade: Tracheophytes
- Clade: Angiosperms
- Clade: Eudicots
- Clade: Asterids
- Order: Ericales
- Family: Ericaceae
- Genus: Rhododendron
- Species: R. glischrum

Binomial name
- Rhododendron glischrum Balf.f. & W.W.Sm.

Synonyms
- Rhododendron glischrum subsp. glischrum

= Rhododendron glischrum =

Species of plant

Rhododendron glischrum (粘毛杜鹃) is a species of flowering plant in the family Ericaceae. It is native to northeastern India, southern Tibet, Myanmar, and northwestern Yunnan, China, where it grows at altitudes of 2,400–3,600 m (7,900–11,800 ft). It is an evergreen tree that typically grows to 2.4–7 m (7.9–23.0 ft) in height, with leaves that are oblong to broadly oblanceolate and 14–22 × 4.6–6.5 cm in size. The flowers are pink with purple flecks and basal blotch.

== Sources ==
- I. B. Balfour & W. W. Smith, Notes Roy. Bot. Gard. Edinburgh. 9: 229. 1916.
