= Adeline May Cowan =

Scottish botanist (1892–1981)

- Born: Adeline May Organe; 26 December 1892; Chennai, British Raj
- Died: March 1981 (aged 88); Sheffield, England
- Occupations: Botanist, teacher
- Spouse: John Macqueen Cowan
- Children: Pauline Harrison; Joan Macqueen Cowan; Sir Robert Cowan

Academic background
- Education: Walthamstow Hall; Somerville College, Oxford

Academic work
- Institutions: Sherborne School for Girls; Polam Hall School; Inverewe Garden
- Main interests: Spermatophytes

Adeline May Cowan (26 December 1892 – March 1981) was a Scottish botanist. She was active in India and was mainly interested in Spermatophytes. The standard author abbreviation A.M.Cowan is used to indicate this person as the author when citing a botanical name.

== Life ==
Born Adeline May Organe in Chennai in 1892, she was the youngest daughter of the missionary Stephen Walker Organe. She studied Botany at Somerville College, Oxford, from 1912 until 1915, after her secondary education at Walthamstow Hall. She was unable to take her degree until the University of Oxford awarded degrees to women in 1920.

From 1915 to 1919 she taught science subjects at Sherborne School for Girls and at Polam Hall School. In 1919 she sailed for India and married the botanist John Macqueen Cowan the day after she arrived in Calcutta. For the next two years she and her husband collected and classified plants and caught elephants. Afterwards they settled in Edinburgh, where she was a member of the Federation of University Women. Later she worked at Inverewe Garden, of which she was appointed curator by the National Trust for Scotland when her husband died in 1960, but she retired a year later as she found Inverewe lonely.

Aged 87, she wrote an unpublished monograph called The Forests of Bengal. Life with my husband in the Indian Forest Service. She was the mother of biochemist Pauline Harrison, who also went up to Somerville College.

== Publications ==
- 1929. The trees of northern Bengal: including shrubs, woody climbers, bamboos, palms and tree ferns. Government of West Bengal, 178 pp. ISBN 81-7089-188-4
- 1964. Inverewe. A Garden in the North-West Highlands
