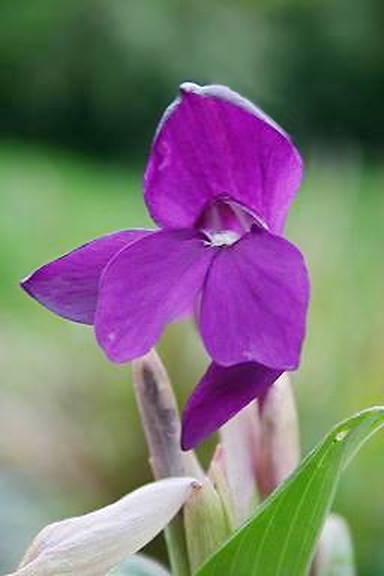

Scientific classification
- Kingdom: Plantae
- Clade: Tracheophytes
- Clade: Angiosperms
- Clade: Monocots
- Clade: Commelinids
- Order: Zingiberales
- Family: Zingiberaceae
- Genus: Roscoea
- Species: R. humeana

Binomial name
- Roscoea humeana Balf.f. & W.W.Sm.

Synonyms
- Roscoea humeana f. alba Cowley; Roscoea humeana f. lutea Cowley; Roscoea humeana f. tyria Cowley; Roscoea sichuanensis R.H.Miau

= Roscoea humeana =

Species of plant

Roscoea humeana is a species of flowering plant in the family Zingiberaceae. It is a perennial occurring in the Sichuan and Yunnan provinces of China. Most members of the ginger family, to which it belongs, are tropical, but R. humeana, like other species of Roscoea, grows in much colder mountainous regions. It is also grown as an ornamental plant in gardens.

== Description ==
Roscoea humeana is a perennial herbaceous plant. Like all members of the genus Roscoea, it dies back each year to a short vertical rhizome, to which are attached the tuberous roots. When growth begins again, "pseudostems" are produced: structures which resemble stems but are actually formed from the tightly wrapped bases (sheaths) of its leaves. In the case of R. humeana, the flowers appear before the leaves are fully grown. Plants are usually 13–25 cm tall, with four to six leaves. Each leaf has a small ligule, extending to about 2 mm. The blade of the leaf (the part free from the pseudostem) is usually 10–30 cm long by 3–6 cm wide. The leaf sheath is smooth (glabrous), tapering to a point.

In its native habitats, R. humeana flowers between April and July. The stem (peduncle) of the flower spike is hidden by the leaf sheaths. One to many flowers open together and may be of various colours: purple, violet, yellow, pink or white. The bracts which subtend the flowers are shorter than the calyx.

Each flower has the typical structure for Roscoea (see the diagrams in that article). There is a long tube-shaped outer calyx, 10–14 cm long with a two-lobed apex. Next the three petals (the corolla) form a tube slightly longer than the calyx, terminating in three lobes, an upright hooded central lobe, 3–4 cm long by 2.5–3 cm wide, and two slightly smaller side lobes, 3–3.5 cm long by about 1.5 cm wide. Inside the petals are structures formed from four sterile stamens (staminodes): two lateral staminodes form what appear to be small upright petals, which are white tinged with purple and 1.5–1.7 cm long; two central staminodes are partially fused at the base to form a lip or labellum, 2–2.5 cm long by about 3 cm wide. The labellum, which is usually smaller than the upper petal, bends backwards and is usually split into two lobes; the sides are wavy.

The single functional stamen has a white anther, about 1.2 cm long, with yellowish-green 6–8 mm long spurs formed from the connective tissue between the two capsules of the anther. The ovary is cylinder-shaped, about 1 cm long, expanding to a 2.5 cm long capsule when seed is set.

== Taxonomy ==
Roscoea humeana was first described scientifically by Isaac Bayley Balfour and William Wright Smith, two Scottish botanists, in 1916. The specific epithet commemorates David Hume, a member of staff at the Royal Botanic Garden Edinburgh, who died at the Battle of Mons in 1914.

== Evolution and phylogeny ==
The family Zingiberaceae is mainly tropical in distribution. The unusual mountainous distribution of Roscoea may have evolved relatively recently and be a response to the uplift taking place in the region in the last 50 million years or so due to the collision of the Indian and Asian tectonic plates.

Species of Roscoea divide into two clear groups, a Himalayan clade and a "Chinese" clade (which includes some species from outside China). The two clades correspond to a geographical separation, their main distributions being divided by the Brahmaputra River as it flows south at the end of the Himalayan mountain chain. It has been suggested that the genus may have originated in this area and then spread westwards along the Himalayas and eastwards into the mountains of China and its southern neighbours. R. humeana falls into the Chinese clade as would be expected from its distribution. It is closely related to R. cautleyoides, R. praecox and R. wardii.

== Distribution and habitat ==
Roscoea humeana occurs in a variety of habitats, such as pine forests, scrub, meadows, grassy and rocky areas, and limestone cliffs, between 2,900 and 3,800 metres in the Sichuan and Yunnan provinces of China.

== Cultivation ==
Some Roscoea species and cultivars, including R. humeana, are grown in rock gardens. They generally require a relatively sunny position with moisture-retaining but well-drained soil. As they do not appear above ground until late spring or even early summer, they escape frost damage in regions where subzero temperatures occur. R. humeana was described in 1999 as "one of the more popular species" that had been cultivated for many years. When grown at Royal Botanic Gardens, Kew, it flowers in May and June before the leaves have fully expanded. When they have, after flowering, this is one of the largest species of the genus in cultivation. It prefers some shade.

=== Award of garden merit ===
R. humeana was included in a trial of Roscoea held by the Royal Horticultural Society from 2009 to 2011. It proved hardy (rating H4, i.e. hardy anywhere in the British Isles) and grew successfully. Three forms and one cultivar were given the Award of Garden Merit. The following currently hold the award:

- R. humeana f. humeana – the typical purple-flowered form which has been in cultivation longest; large purple flowers
- R. humeana f. lutea – as f. humeana but with pale yellow flowers
- R. humeana 'Stephanie Bloom' – also compact, with "rich purple" flowers and whitish floral sheaths; short leaves at flowering time

For propagation, see Roscoea: Cultivation.

== Bibliography ==
- Cowley, Jill & Wilford, Richard (2000), "Plate 383. Roscoea humeana forma lutea", Curtis's Botanical Magazine, 17 (1): 22–28, doi:10.1111/1467-8748.00242
