= Allium beesianum =

蓝花韭 lan hua jiu

Scientific classification
- Kingdom: Plantae
- Clade: Tracheophytes
- Clade: Angiosperms
- Clade: Monocots
- Order: Asparagales
- Family: Amaryllidaceae
- Subfamily: Allioideae
- Genus: Allium
- Subgenus: A. subg. Reticulatobulbosa
- Species: A. beesianum

Binomial name
- Allium beesianum W.W. Sm.

Species of plant

Allium beesianum is a plant species native to southern China, provinces of Yunnan and Sichuan. It grows on slopes and in meadows at elevations of 3000–4200 m.

Allium beesianum produces cylindrical bulbs up to 10 mm in diameter. Scapes are round in cross-section, up to 60 cm tall. Umbels appear hemispheric from a distance. Flowers are blue.
