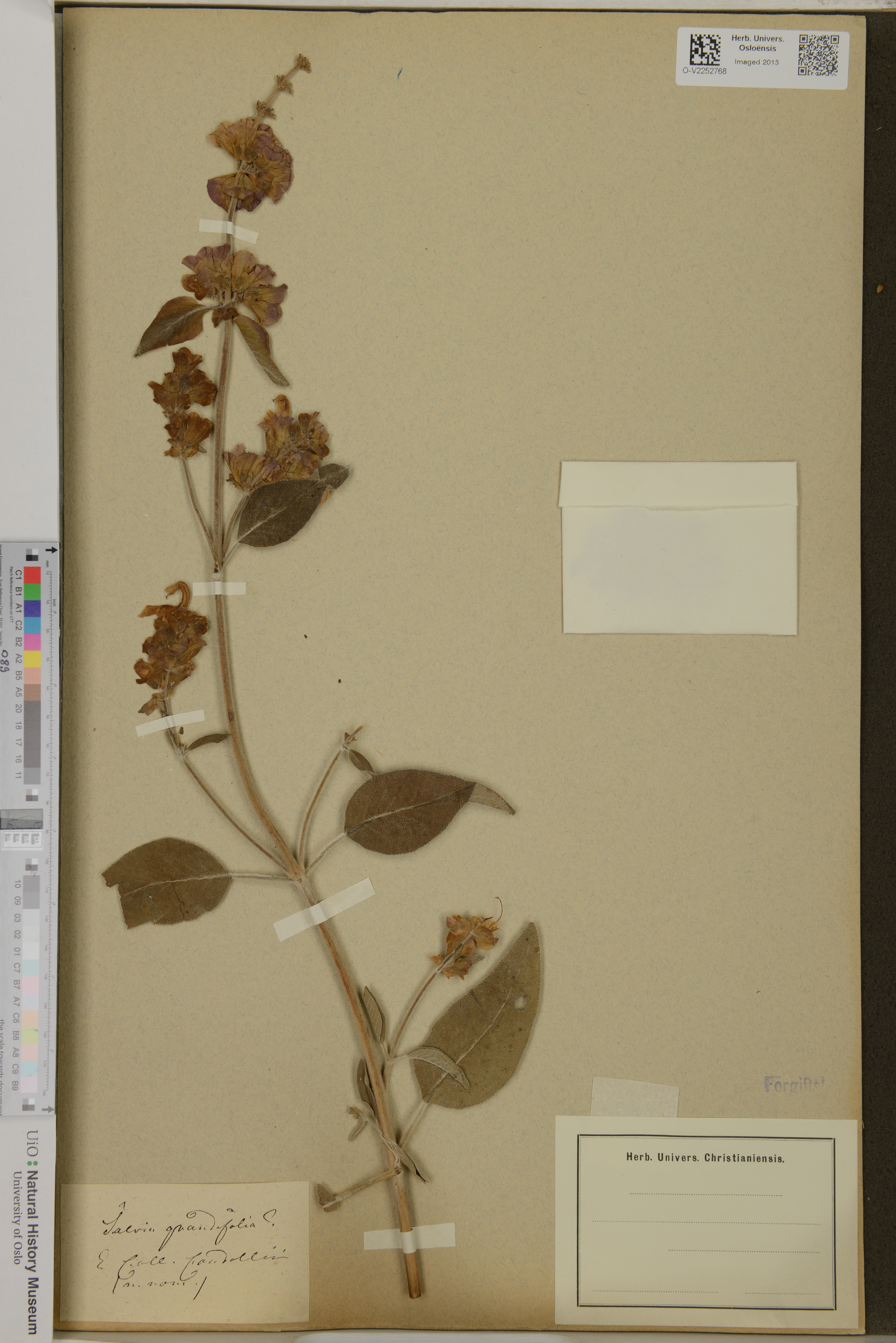

Scientific classification
- Kingdom: Plantae
- Clade: Tracheophytes
- Clade: Angiosperms
- Clade: Eudicots
- Clade: Asterids
- Order: Lamiales
- Family: Lamiaceae
- Genus: Salvia
- Species: S. grandifolia

Binomial name
- Salvia grandifolia W.W.Sm.

= Salvia grandifolia =

Species of flowering plant

Salvia grandifolia (Chinese clary) is a perennial plant that is native to Yunnan and Sichuan provinces in China, found growing in gorges at 2,000 to 3,000 m (6,600 to 9,800 ft) elevation.

== Description ==
S. grandifolia grows on erect stems to 1.5 m (4.9 ft) tall, with large obovate leaves that are up to 35 cm (14 in) long and 25 cm (9.8 in) wide. Inflorescences are 2-flowered widely spaced verticillasters that form many-branched terminal panicles, with a purple-red corolla that is yellowish at its base, typically about 2.4 cm (0.94 in) long.
