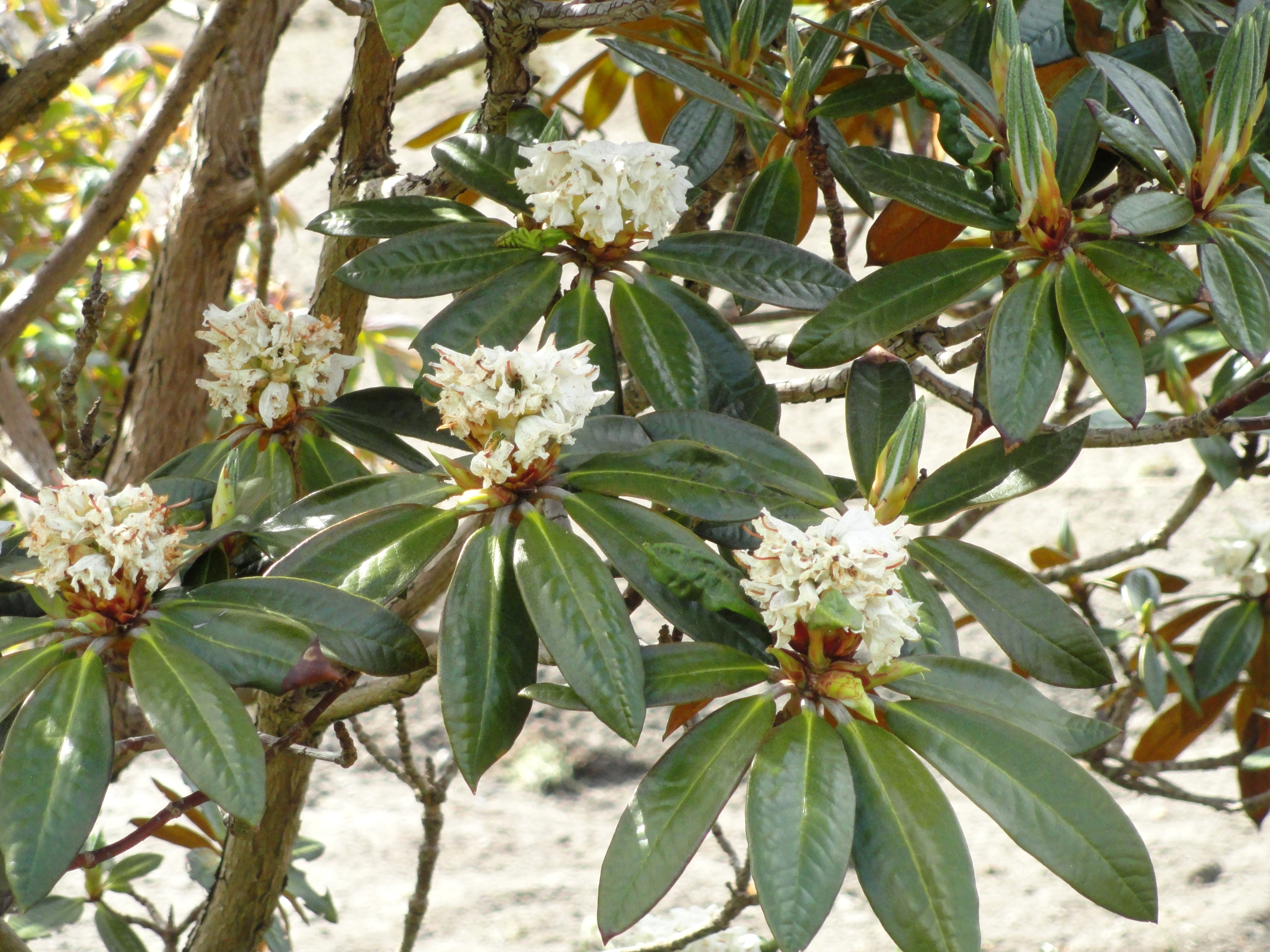
- R. alutaceum var. russotinctum

Scientific classification
- Kingdom: Plantae
- Clade: Tracheophytes
- Clade: Angiosperms
- Clade: Eudicots
- Clade: Asterids
- Order: Ericales
- Family: Ericaceae
- Genus: Rhododendron
- Species: R. alutaceum

Binomial name
- Rhododendron alutaceum Balf.f. & W.W.Sm.

Synonyms
- Rhododendron alutaceum var. alutaceum Rhododendron globigerum Balf.f. & Forrest; Rhododendron roxieanum var. globigerum (Balf. f. & Forrest) D.F. Chamb.

= Rhododendron alutaceum =

Species of plant

Rhododendron alutaceum is a species of flowering plant in the family Ericaceae. It is native to Tibet and southwestern China (western Sichuan, southeastern Xizang, and northwestern Yunnan), where it grows at altitudes of 3,200–4,300 m (10,500–14,100 ft). This evergreen shrub that grows to 1.5–4 m (4.9–13.1 ft) in height, with thick, leathery leaves that are oblong and broadly lanceolate to lanceolate or narrowly oblong, 5–14 by 1.5–3.5 cm in size. The flowers are white to pink, with crimson spots and purplish-red basal blotch.

The species was first described by Balfour and Smith in 1917.

== Varieties ==
- R. alutaceum var. alutaceum
- R. alutaceum var. iodes (Balf. f. & Forrest) D.F. Chamb.
- R. alutaceum var. russotinctum (Balf. f. & Forrest) D.F. Chamb.

== Sources ==
- Balfour, Bayley (November 1917). "New Species of Rhododendron". Notes from the Royal Botanic Garden, Edinburgh (in Latin). 10 (47/48): 79–166, especially pp. 81–83: "Rhododendron alutaceum."
