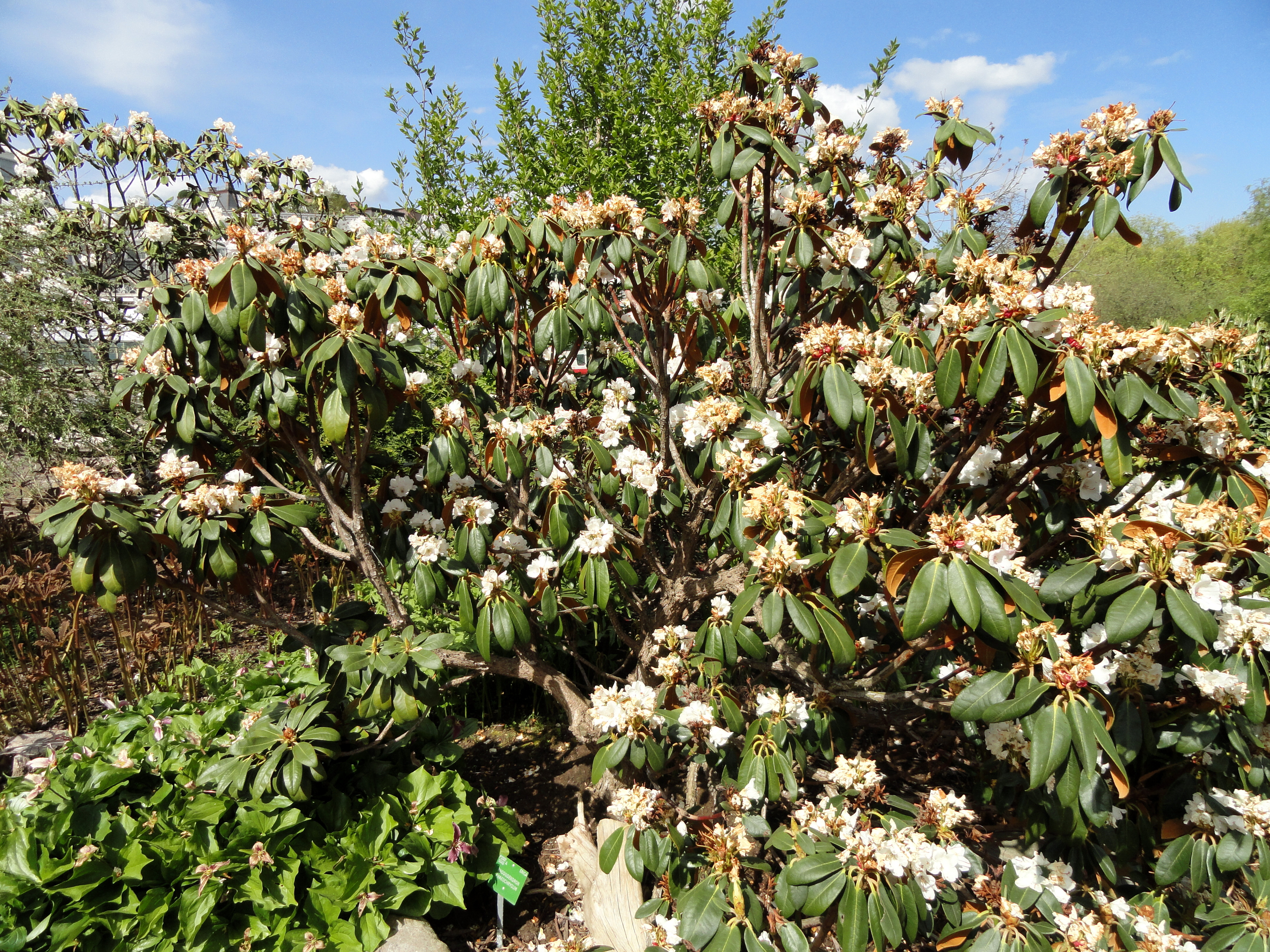

Scientific classification
- Kingdom: Plantae
- Clade: Tracheophytes
- Clade: Angiosperms
- Clade: Eudicots
- Clade: Asterids
- Order: Ericales
- Family: Ericaceae
- Genus: Rhododendron
- Species: R. phaeochrysum

Binomial name
- Rhododendron phaeochrysum Balf.f. & W.W.Sm.

Synonyms
- Rhododendron dryophyllum Balf.f. & Forrest; Rhododendron cuprescens Nitz.

= Rhododendron phaeochrysum =

Species of plant

Rhododendron phaeochrysum (栎叶杜鹃) is a species of flowering plant in the family Ericaceae. It is native to western Sichuan, southeastern Xizang, and northwestern Yunnan in China, where it grows at altitudes of 3,000–4,800 m (9,800–15,700 ft). It is an evergreen shrub that grows to 1–4.5 m (3.3–14.8 ft) in height, with leathery leaves that are oblong-elliptic to ovate-oblong, 5–14 by 2–5.5 cm in size. The flowers are white to pale pink, with purplish spots.

== Sources ==
- "Rhododendron phaeochrysum", I. B. Balfour & W. W. Smith, Notes Roy. Bot. Gard. Edinburgh. 10: 131. 1917.
