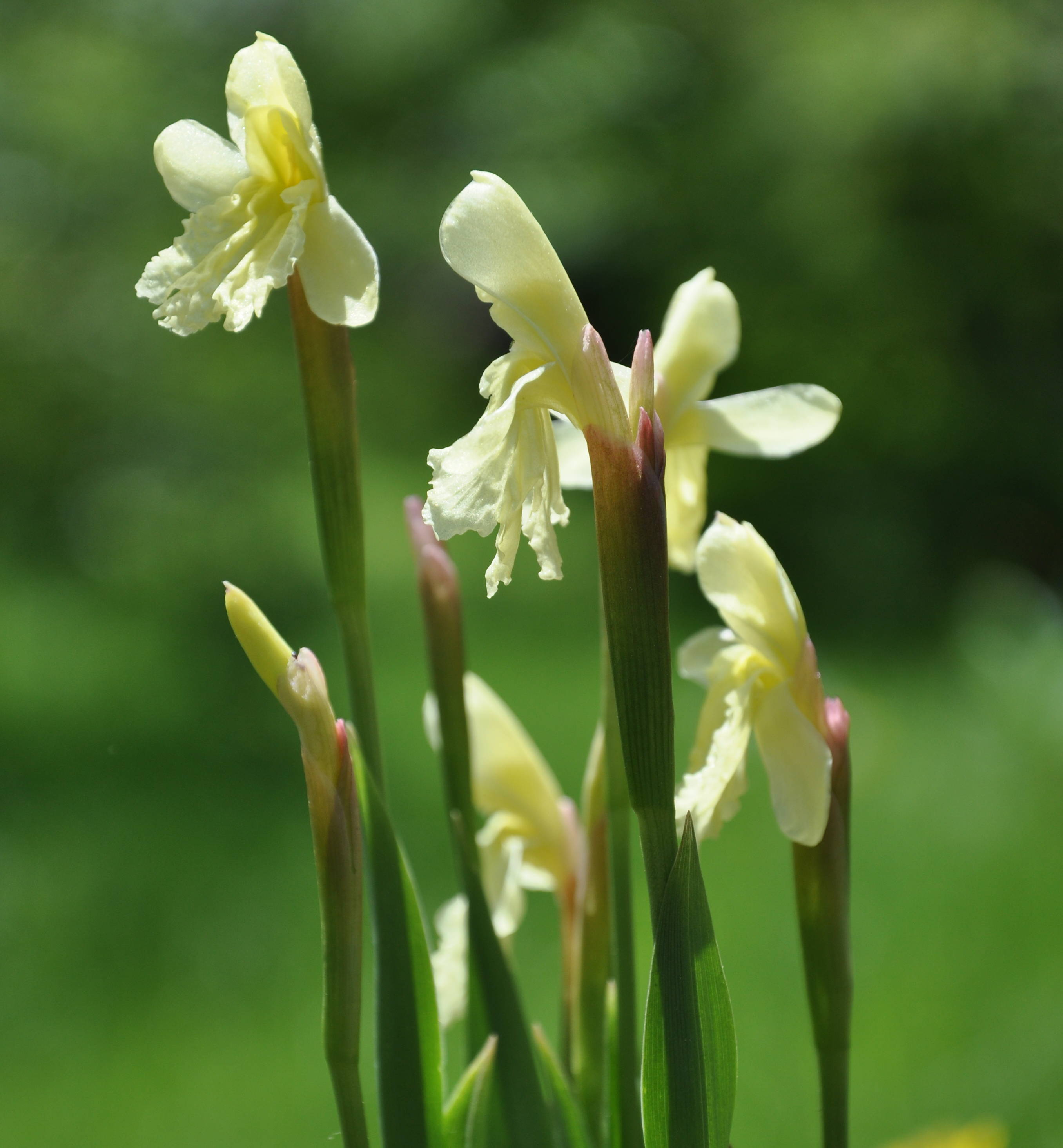
- Yellow-flowered form

Scientific classification
- Kingdom: Plantae
- Clade: Tracheophytes
- Clade: Angiosperms
- Clade: Monocots
- Clade: Commelinids
- Order: Zingiberales
- Family: Zingiberaceae
- Genus: Roscoea
- Species: R. cautleyoides

Binomial name
- Roscoea cautleyoides Gagnep.

Synonyms
- Roscoea capitata var. purpurata Gagnep.; Roscoea cautleyoides f. atropurpurea Cowley; Roscoea cautleyoides var. purpurea (Gagnep.) Stapf; Roscoea cautleyoides f. sinopurpurea Cowley; Roscoea chamaeleon Gagnep.; Roscoea sinopurpurea Stapf; Roscoea yunnanensis Loes.; Roscoea yunnanensis var. purpurata (Gagnep.) Loes.

= Roscoea cautleyoides =

Species of flowering plant

Roscoea cautleyoides is a perennial herbaceous plant occurring in the Sichuan and Yunnan provinces of China. The scientific name is also spelt Roscoea cautleoides (see below). Most members of the ginger family (Zingiberaceae), to which it belongs, are tropical, but R. cautleyoides, like other species of Roscoea, grows in much colder mountainous regions. It is sometimes grown as an ornamental plant in gardens.

== Description ==
Roscoea cautleyoides is a perennial herbaceous plant. Like all members of the genus Roscoea, it dies back each year to a short vertical rhizome, to which are attached the tuberous roots. When growth begins again, "pseudostems" are produced: structures which resemble stems but are formed from the tightly wrapped bases (sheaths) of its leaves. R. cautleyoides is usually 15–40 cm tall (occasionally up to 60 cm), with three or four leaves. Each leaf has a small ligule, extending to about 1 mm. The blade of the leaf (the part free from the pseudostem) is usually 5–15 cm long (occasionally up to 40 long) by 1.5–3 cm wide. The leaf sheath is smooth (glabrous) or hairy (pubescent), with hairs which are more-or-less bent over (appressed). The lower part of the leaf blade is similar; the upper part is scaly.

In its native habitats, R. cautleyoides flowers between May and August. The flower spike emerges somewhat from the leaf sheaths. One or more flowers open together and may be of various colours: purple, yellow, white or less often pale pink. Green bracts, 4–6 cm long, with brownish veins, subtend the flowers.

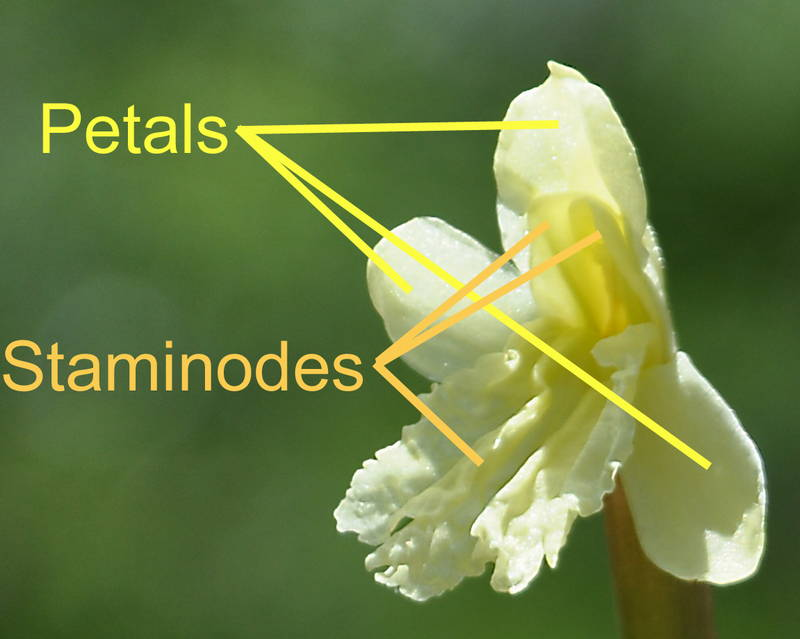
Flower of Roscoea cautleyoides showing the petals and staminodes

Each flower has the typical structure for Roscoea. There is a tube-shaped outer calyx, 3–6 cm long, split to the middle on one side with a two-toothed apex. Next the three petals (the corolla) form a tube 3–3.5 cm long, terminating in three lobes, each 2–2.5 cm long: an upright central lobe and two side lobes. Inside the petals are structures formed from four sterile stamens (staminodes): two lateral staminodes form what appear to be small upright petals; two central staminodes are fused at the base to form a lip or labellum, 2.5–3 cm long. This bends backwards and is split at the end into two lobes; the sides are wavy. The single functional stamen has a linear anther, 1–1.5 cm long (including a spur formed from the connective tissue between the two capsules of the anther).

== Taxonomy ==
The specific epithet was originally spelt cautleoides when the species was named in 1901 by the French botanist François Gagnepain. The name was given because of the similarity of this species – particularly the yellow colour of the flowers in some forms – to the taxon Gagnepain knew either as the genus Cautlea or as Roscoea section Cautlea.

However, Cautlea Royle is an invalid name (it was not accepted by the author), and was validated as Cautleya Hook.f. (i.e. with an added "y"). The name honours Sir Proby Thomas Cautley. The spelling of Gagnepain's name has been altered to Roscoea cautleyoides by, for example, the World Checklist of Selected Plant Families. Much of the literature, including the IPNI, still uses the original spelling.

== Evolution and phylogeny ==
The family Zingiberaceae is mainly tropical in distribution. The unusual mountainous distribution of Roscoea may have evolved relatively recently and be a response to the uplift taking place in the region in the last 50 million years or so due to the collision of the Indian and Asian tectonic plates.

Species of Roscoea divide into two clear groups, a Himalayan clade and a "Chinese" clade (which includes some species from outside China). The two clades correspond to a geographical separation, their main distributions being divided by the Brahmaputra River as it flows south at the end of the Himalayan mountain chain. It has been suggested that the genus may have originated in this area and then spread westwards along the Himalayas and eastwards into the mountains of China and its southern neighbours. R. cautleyoides falls into the Chinese clade as would be expected from its distribution. It is closely related to R. humeana, R. praecox and R. wardii.

== Distribution and habitat ==
Roscoea cautleyoides occurs in pine forests, low scrub, meadows, and grasslands, between 2,000 and 3,500 metres in the Sichuan and Yunnan provinces of China.

== Cultivation ==
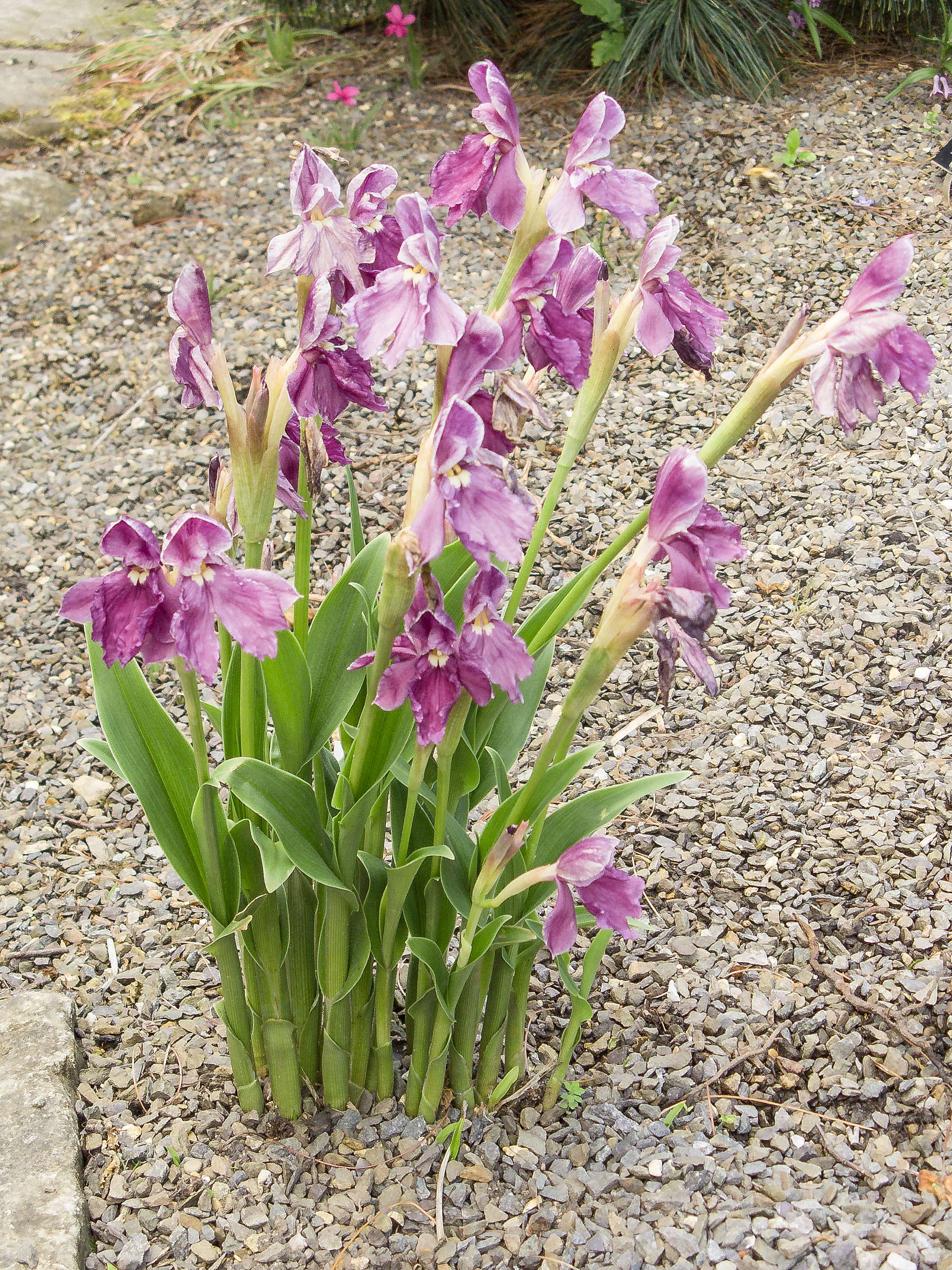
Roscoea cautleyoides 'Early Purple' at RHS Garden, Wisley

Some Roscoea species and cultivars, including R. cautleyoides, are grown in rock gardens. They generally require a relatively sunny position with moisture-retaining but well-drained soil. As they do not appear above ground until late spring or even early summer, they escape frost damage in regions where subzero temperatures occur. R. cautleyoides has been described as one of the "more commonly grown species" and as a robust plant that can cope with sunnier conditions and drier soil than other species of Roscoea. In cultivation, the various colour forms were noted as flowering at different times, yellow forms usually flowering before purple ones, which could start flowering as late as June in England at the Royal Botanic Gardens, Kew.

=== AGM cultivars ===
R. cautleyoides was included in a trial of Roscoea held by the Royal Horticultural Society from 2009 to 2011. It proved hardy (rating H4, i.e. hardy anywhere in the British Isles). Six cultivars were given the Award of Garden Merit:

- 'Abigail Bloom' – compact, to 30 cm or less; very pale yellow flowers with a wide dorsal petal; flowering stem (peduncle) held within the leaves
- 'Helen Lamb'
- 'Himalaya' – pale yellow flowers (darker than 'Abigail Bloom'), opening on all sides; flowering stem protruding from the leaves
- 'Jeffrey Thomas' – strong growing; flowers with a pale yellow labellum and darker yellow petals
- 'Purple Queen' (subject to availability) – tall, early-flowering, with large numbers of dull purple flowers with yellow markings at the base of the labellum
- 'Stephanie Bloom' - magenta purple flowers

A self-sown yellow seedling with wider leaves and a shorter flower stem (peduncle) than the typical species was initially named R. cautleyoides var. grandiflora and then R. cautleyoides 'Kew Beauty'. It is now thought to be a hybrid between R. cautleyoides and R. humeana. It was also awarded an AGM.

For propagation, see Roscoea: Cultivation.
