= Astley Ainslie Hospital =

- NHS Lothian
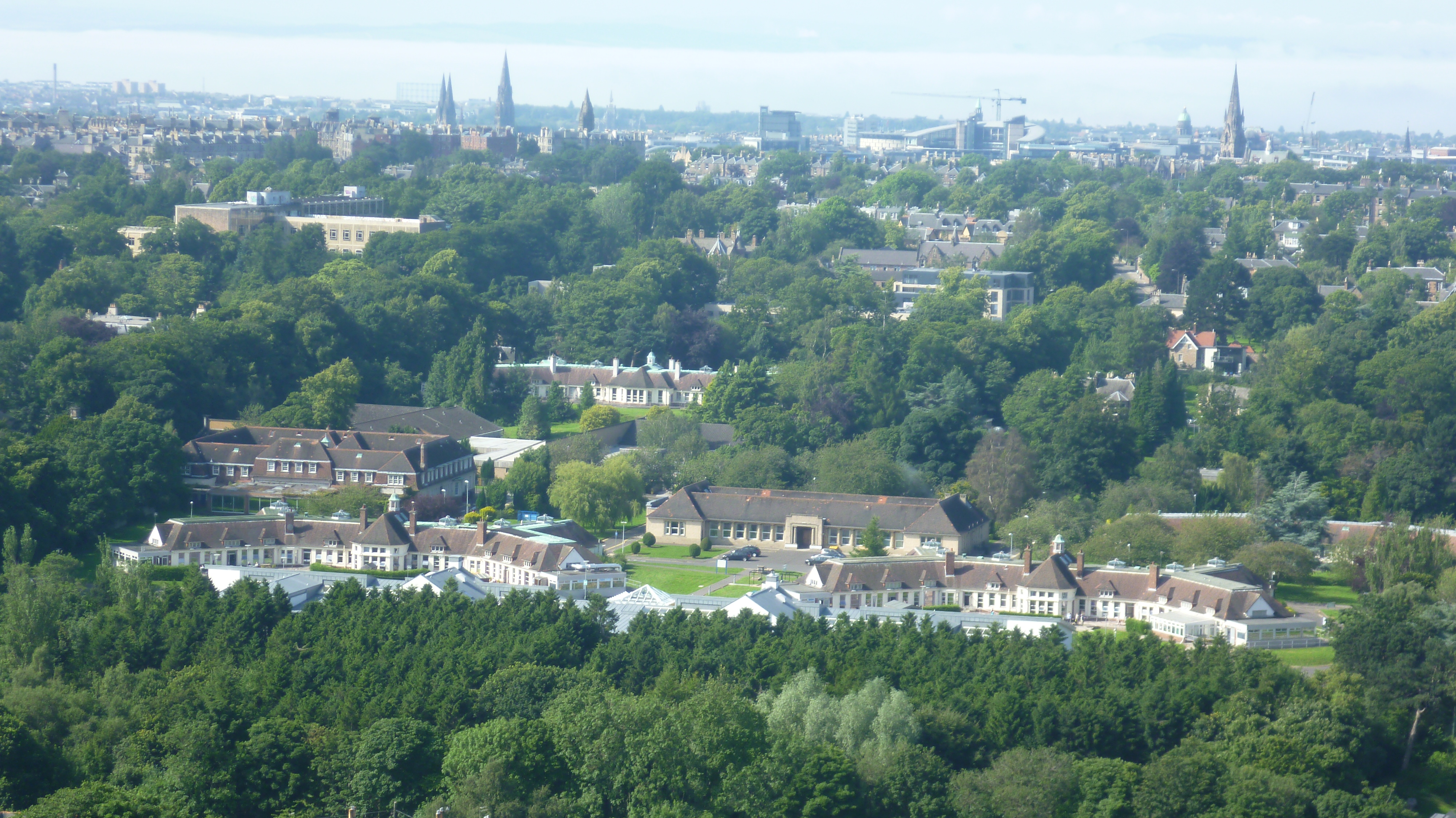
- The Astley Ainslie Hospital viewed from Blackford Hill

- Shown in Edinburgh

Geography
- Location: Edinburgh, Scotland
- Coordinates: 55°55′50″N 3°11′50″W

Organisation
- Care system: NHS Scotland
- Type: Rehabilitation hospital

Services
- Beds: 14

History
- Founded: 1923

Links
- Website: Website
- Other links: List of hospitals in Scotland

The Astley Ainslie Hospital is a community hospital in The Grange area of Edinburgh, Scotland. It is operated by NHS Lothian.

== History ==
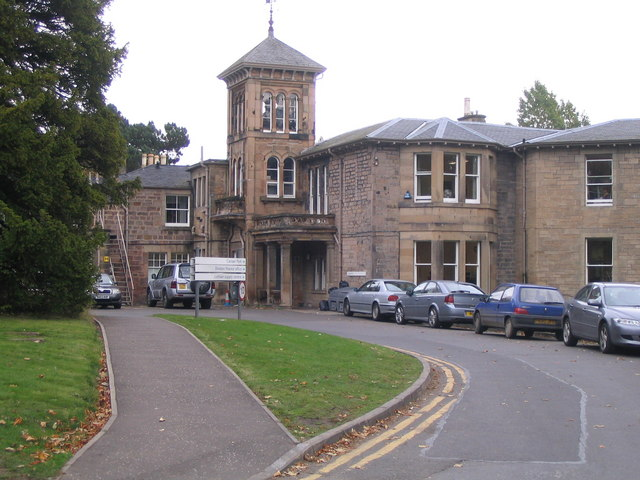

David Ainslie, who died in 1900, left £800,000 for the purpose of building and endowing a hospital or institution for convalescents from the Royal Infirmary of Edinburgh. He wanted it to be called the Astley Ainslie Institution. The hospital opened with 34 beds in 1923. The landscaping of the grounds was executed by Roland Edgar Cooper, just prior to his becoming Head Curator of the Royal Botanic Garden Edinburgh. The site may have had a medical connection since the 1500s.

Pavilions were added to the east and west in 1929 and a nurses' home was completed in 1930. The hospital joined the National Health Service in 1948.

In the 1950s, Colonel John Fraser, while medical superintendent at the hospital, built a collection of ecclesiastical stones, some bearing initials and dates, into a specially constructed stone panel in the south boundary wall of his residence, South Bank. The Charles Bell children's pavilion was completed in 1965 and the Cunningham Unit (a day centre and outpatient clinic) was completed in 1971. A disabled living centre followed in 1979 and the Balfour Pavilion for older people was completed in 1983.

In 2007 the hospital became the home of the Southeast Mobility and Rehabilitation Technology Centre ("SMART Centre"): the centre was designed to house clinical, technical, office and storage facilities for a range of rehabilitation services. The centre provides 4,000 m^{2} of space and cost £7.5 million to construct, incorporating a number of environmentally friendly features.

In 2014, the health board considered proposals to demolish the hospital and three others, with a view to replacing these facilities with care villages which would consist of buildings more suited to social care.

By 2021, the 17-hectare (42-acre) campus site was proposed for sale in the late 2020s, provided funding could be obtained for replacement facilities at the Royal Edinburgh Hospital. The value of the wooded parkland, that is open to the public, was recognised by the local NHS Lothian health board. The Astley Ainslie Community Trust was set up to campaign to protect the trees in the site. Members of the trust include Ian Rankin. The two thousand trees include some that are unusual in the UK such as Atlas cedar, wellingtonia, cedar of Lebanon, deodar cedar, Bhutan pine and Monterey cypress as well as many more common species of oaks, firs, cherry and chestnuts. Some are protected with tree preservation orders.

== Services ==
The hospital specialises in rehabilitative care for people who have suffered brain injuries, stroke, orthopaedic or cardiac conditions and respite care for elderly people.
