= John Macqueen Cowan =

Scottish botanist (1891–1960)

- Born: 1891; Banchory, Scotland
- Died: 1960 (aged 68–69)
- Education: University of Edinburgh, University of Oxford
- Known for: Studies on trees in the Indian sub-continent
- Spouse: Adeline May Organe
- Children: Pauline Harrison; Joan Cowan (1922–1954); Robert Cowan
- Awards: Veitch Memorial Medal (1951), Victoria Medal of Honour (1958), Commander of the Order of the British Empire (CBE) (1952)
- Scientific career
- Fields: Botany, Spermatophyte
- Workplaces: Indian Forest Service, Royal Botanic Garden Edinburgh, Inverewe Garden

John Macqueen Cowan FRSE CBE (1891–1960) was a prominent Scottish botanist in the mid 20th century. He is especially remembered for the recording and classification of trees on the Indian sub-continent. He was also an expert on Spermatophytes.

== Life ==
Cowan was born in Banchory in northern Scotland in 1891. He was educated at Robert Gordon's College in Aberdeen. He then attended both Edinburgh and Oxford University training as a botanist, specialising in trees, receiving a postgraduate doctorate (DSc) from Edinburgh in 1927. From 1927 to 1929 he worked with the Indian Forest Service and conducted many studies of tree species throughout India.

In February 1929 he made a study trip around the Near East with fellow botanist Cyril Darlington. He worked at the Royal Botanic Garden Edinburgh 1930 to 1954 alongside Roland Edgar Cooper (both then under William Wright Smith). In 1954 Cowan took over as Curator of Inverewe Garden on the west coast of Scotland. During the Second World War he provided valuable advice to the Ministry of Supply in relation to the Home-Grown Timber Production Department.

In 1931 he was elected a Fellow of the Royal Society of Edinburgh his proposers including Sir William Wright Smith, William Grant Craib and Albert William Borthwick.

He served as president of the Botanical Society of Edinburgh for 1951–53. He was awarded the Veitch Memorial Medal in 1951 and the Victoria Medal of Honour in 1958. Queen Elizabeth created him a Commander of the Order of the British Empire (CBE) in 1952.

He died in 1960.

== Publications ==
- The Flora of the Chakaria Sundarbans (1928); Library of Congress Catalog entry
- with Adeline May Cowan: The Trees of Northern Bengal (1929)
- The Forests of Kalimpong (1929); Library of Congress Catalog entry
- Nature Study Talks on Animals and Plants (1929)
- The History of the Royal Botanic Garden Edinburgh (1935)
- A Guide to the Younger Botanic Garden at Benmore, Argyllshire (1937)
- The Rhododendron Leaf (1949) ASIN B0000CHUO7
- The Wildlife of the Sundarbans Chakaria (1952)

== Family ==
Cowan married fellow-botanist Adeline May Organe (died 1981). Their second daughter was Pauline Cowan (born 1926) who, as Pauline Harrison, was later given a personal Chair in the Department of Biochemistry at Sheffield University.
