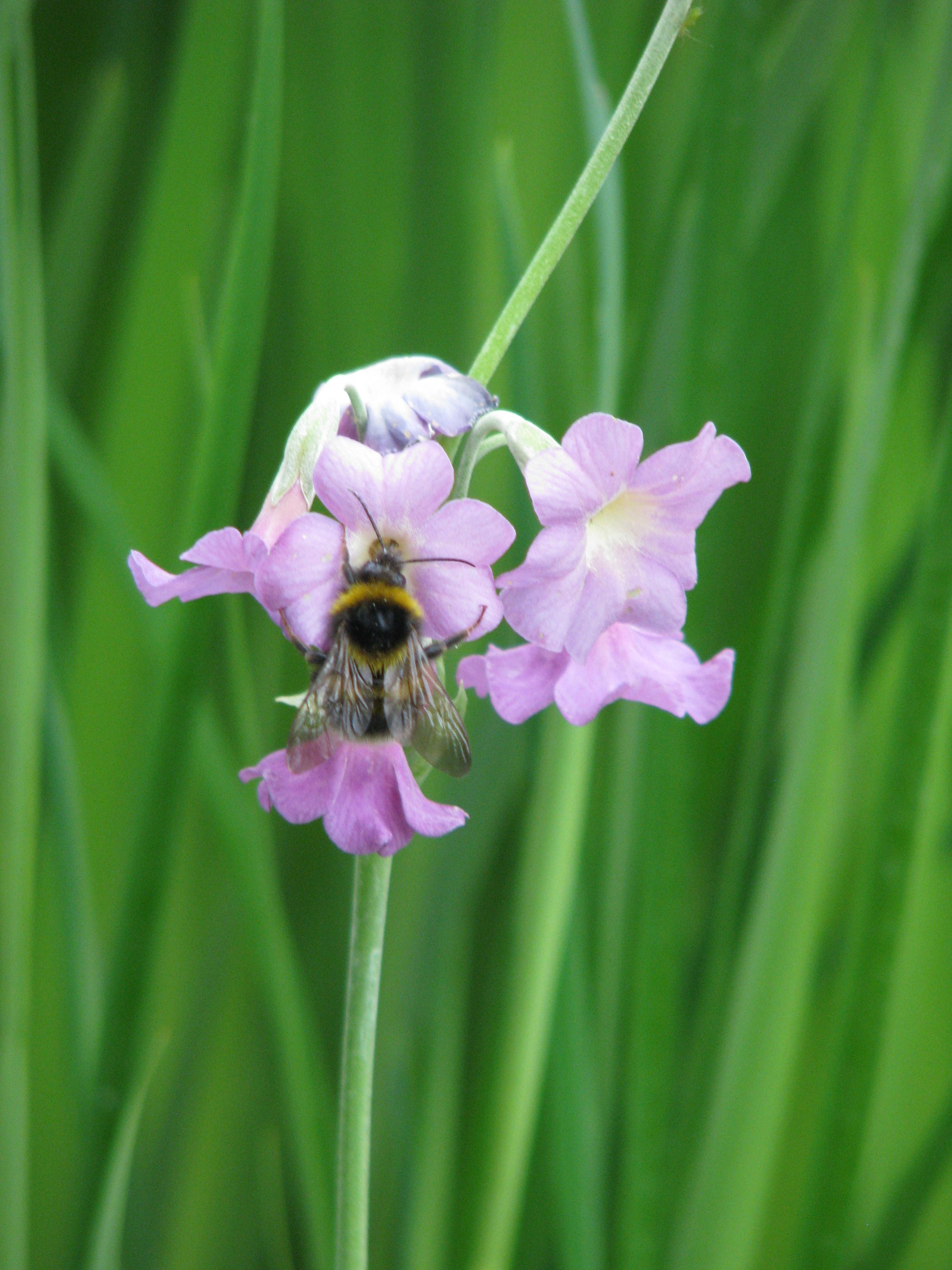

Scientific classification
- Kingdom: Plantae
- Clade: Embryophytes
- Clade: Tracheophytes
- Clade: Spermatophytes
- Clade: Angiosperms
- Clade: Eudicots
- Clade: Asterids
- Order: Ericales
- Family: Primulaceae
- Genus: Primula
- Species: P. alpicola

Binomial name
- Primula alpicola (W.W.Sm.) Stapf

= Primula alpicola =

Species of flowering plant

Primula alpicola, the moonlight primrose, is a species of Primula native to Bhutan and southeastern Tibet, where it grows in vast numbers along the Tsangpo valley alongside Primula florindae. Their habitats hardly ever overlap; P. florindae prefers wetter soils close to rivers, giving way to P. alpicola on drier sites.

It was first collected for western horticulture in 1926 by Frank Kingdon-Ward, and was described as a variety of Primula microdonta by William Wright Smith, but later raised to a distinct species by Otto Stapf.

It grows to 15–50 cm (rarely to 1 m) tall with many bell-shaped flowers. The flowers can be in several colours, white, cream, yellow and shades of purple. These are sometimes referred to as varieties, such as var. violacea; however there is some considerable inconsistency in the naming. Kingdon-Ward gave it the temporary name "Joseph's Sikkimensis" after Joseph's coat of many colours.

This plant is hardy in most of the UK and is available from specialist and larger garden centres. It has gained the Royal Horticultural Society's Award of Garden Merit.
