= Osgood Mackenzie =

Scottish landowner

Osgood Hanbury Mackenzie (1842–1922; Scottish Gaelic: Osgood MacCoinnich) was a Scottish landowner and the creator of a famous garden at Inverewe, near Poolewe in Wester Ross.

== Origins ==
Mackenzie was born on 13 May 1842, at the Chateau de Talhouet, near Quimperlé, in Morbihan, Brittany. His father was Sir Francis Mackenzie, 5th baronet and 12th laird of Gairloch. The Mackenzies were a clan from the Northwest Highlands that had risen to prominence in the 15th century during the disintegration of the Lordship of the Isles. Mackenzie’s ancestor, Hector Roy Mackenzie, had acquired the lands of Gairloch towards the end of the 15th century. Mackenzie’s mother, Mary, was the daughter of Osgood Hanbury, of Holfield Grange, Coggeshall, Essex.

== Life ==
Mackenzie’s father died a year or so after he was born. He was educated at home, in the tradition of his family, and brought up to speak both English and Gaelic. In 1862, with the help of his mother he purchased the 12,000-acre (49 km^{2}) estate of Inverewe and Kernsary. There he built a Scottish Baronial style mansion and set about creating a garden.

Mackenzie concentrated first on establishing shelter belts of native and Scandinavian pines and built a walled garden. He also created woodland walks. Within 40 years, he had established one of the finest collections in Scotland of temperate plants from both northern and southern hemispheres.

Mackenzie wrote a volume of memoirs (published by Edwin Arnold in London in 1921), entitled A Hundred Years in the Highlands. A second edition of these (Geoffrey Bles, London, 1949) contained an additional chapter by his daughter. Little space in the memoirs is devoted to Mackenzie's gardening activities; they instead provide a charming account of Highland country life and society, both in Mackenzie's own time and in his grandfather's.

== Family ==
On 26 June 1877, Mackenzie married Minna Amy, the daughter of Sir Thomas Edwards-Moss, 1st Baronet. They had one child, Mary (Mairi) Thyra, who married first (18 April 1907) Robert John Hanbury (died 5 April 1933) and secondly (2 July 1935) Captain Ronald Sawyer (died 25 October 1945). She died in July 1953.

Mackenzie’s marriage broke down while his daughter was still a child. A dispute between him and his wife as to their daughter’s custody was eventually taken to court.

== Death and posterity ==
Mackenzie died on 15 April 1922. On his death, Inverewe was inherited by his daughter. Following the death of her second husband, and being without any children, she began discussions with the National Trust for Scotland about the future ownership of the garden in 1950. She gave the garden to the National Trust for Scotland in 1952, together with an endowment for its future upkeep.

== See also ==
- Inverewe Garden
