= Pauline Harrison =

British protein crystallographer (1926–2024)

Pauline May Harrison
- Born: 24 August 1926
- Died: 28 May 2024 (aged 97)
- Education: Somerville College, Oxford
- Known for: Protein crystallography of ferritin
- Spouse: Royden Harrison
- Awards: CBE, DSc
- Scientific career
- Fields: Biology, crystallography
- Workplaces: University of Sheffield
- Thesis: X-Ray crystallographic studies in some peptides and proteins (1952)
- Doctoral advisor: Dorothy Hodgkin

Pauline May Harrison (née Cowan, 24 August 1926 – 28 May 2024) was a British protein crystallographer and professor emeritus at the University of Sheffield. She gained her chemistry degree from Somerville College, Oxford in 1948, followed by a DPhil in X-ray crystallography in 1952 supervised by Dorothy Hodgkin. After three years at King's College London (contemporary with Rosalind Franklin) she moved to the University of Sheffield in 1955 as a demonstrator in the Biochemistry department (now Molecular Biology and Biotechnology), obtaining an MRC grant to study the iron storage protein Ferritin, publishing preliminary X-ray diffraction data in the 1st volume of the Journal of Molecular Biology in 1959. The molecule which became her life's work. In 1978, she was awarded a personal chair and retired in 1991. In 2001 she was appointed a CBE for services to higher education.

== Personal life and death ==
Harrison was the daughter of botanists Adeline May Organe and John Macqueen Cowan, Assistant Keeper of the Royal Botanic Garden, Edinburgh. She was married to Royden Harrison, also a lecturer at Sheffield and a figure in the Labour movement until his death in 2002. Harrison was an alumna of St. Trinnean's School.

Harrison died on 28 May 2024, at the age of 97.
