= Royden Harrison =

British labour historian

- Born: Royden John Harrison; 3 March 1927; London, England
- Died: 30 June 2002 (aged 75)
- Spouse: Pauline Cowan

Academic background
- Education: St Catherine's College, Oxford
- Doctoral advisor: G. D. H. Cole

Academic work
- Discipline: History
- Sub-discipline: Labour history
- Institutions: University of Sheffield (1955–1971); University of Warwick (1971–1982)

Royden John Harrison (3 March 1927 – 30 June 2002) was a British labour historian.

He was born in London and educated at King Alfred's School, Hampstead, before being evacuated to Canada and Australia because of the Second World War. He attended a progressive school in Australia, where he was tutored in logic and philosophy by an Austrian-Jewish refugee.

He read Philosophy, Politics and Economics at St Catherine's College, Oxford, after he won an ex-servicemen's scholarship. Here he was tutored by G. D. H. Cole, who also oversaw Harrison's doctorate in English Positivism. While at Oxford he met his future wife, Pauline Cowan, who was a molecular biologist. After they were both awarded PhDs, they took up posts at Sheffield University, where he became a lecturer in 1955. It was here, with Kenneth Alexander and John Hughes, that he founded day-release educational courses for miners from Derbyshire and Yorkshire. Harrison also represented the National Union of Public Employees on Sheffield's trades and labour council.

Harrison was a member of the Communist Party of Great Britain until 1956, when he joined the Labour Party. In 1960 he helped found the Society of the Study of Labour History and became editor of its bulletin (which was later renamed the Labour History Journal).

In 1965 he was appointed senior lecturer at Bernard Crick's Department of Political Theory and Institutions at Sheffield before he became reader in 1969. In 1971 he succeeded E. P. Thompson as Professor and Director of Warwick University's Centre for the Study of Social History. Here he oversaw the founding of the modern records centre for storing the papers of the Trades Union Congress and the Confederation of British Industry, as well as those of other unions and businesses. Harrison also created a research programme in which he adapted methods used in the natural sciences, which he had learnt from his wife.

Harrison contributed an essay to the first volume of Essays in Labour History in 1960. In his first book, Before the Socialists (1965), he employed a "history from below" perspective to study the relationship between labour and politics during 1861–1881. He also edited a collection of essays from what he called his "student collective" at Warwick: The Independent Collier was published in 1978 and, according to John Halstead, it "transformed the study of the miners". Divisions of Labour (1985) focused on the "labour aristocracy".

== Works ==
- Before The Socialists: Studies in Labour and Politics, 1861–1881 (Routledge: 1965; 2nd edn, Gregg Revivals, 1994).
- (editor), The English Defence of the Commune (Merlin, 1971).
- (editor), The Independent Collier: The Coal Miner as Archetypal Proletarian Reconsidered (Harvester, 1978).
- (editor with J. Zeitlin), Divisions of Labour: Skilled Workers and Technological Change in Nineteenth Century Britain (Harvester, 1985).
- The Life and Times of Sidney and Beatrice Webb, 1858-1905: The Formative Years (Macmillan, 1999).
