= Roland Edgar Cooper =

Botanist (1890–1962)

Roland Edgar Cooper FRSE FRSGS (16 June 1890 – 31 January 1962) was a British botanist and Curator of the Royal Botanic Garden Edinburgh from 1936 to 1950. Within the Gardens the Roland Edgar Cooper Collection stems from his own work. A number of species found by him bear the name Cooperi. A large number of Rhododendrons collected by Cooper continue to grow in the Gardens.

== Life ==
He was born at Kingston-on-Thames in 1890, and was apparently orphaned aged only four and later raised by his aunt Emma. Her husband, William Wright Smith, later became Regius Keeper of the Royal Botanic Garden Edinburgh, creating Roland's link to his future role.

In 1907 he travelled to India with his uncle to study and collect samples in Sikkim, Nepal, Tibet and Bhutan until 1910. This was aided by the local collector and plant expert, Rohmoo Lapcha. He then came to Edinburgh to undertake a Horticulture course at the Royal Botanic Garden. In 1913 he returned to India (without his uncle) and travelled more widely in search of species, beginning in the Himalayas. He again explored Sikkim and in 1914–15 returned to Bhutan, before exploring the Punjab in 1916.

In the second half of the First World War, he served as an officer with the 1st Gurkha Rifles in north-west India. He was later attached to the Royal Flying Corps and stationed at Alexandria, Egypt in 1918–19.

Staying mentally attached to the Indian subcontinent, he took on the role of Superintendent of the Botanic Gardens at Maymyo in the Shan Hills of Burma in 1921. Now married and with a young family, he returned to Britain in the late 1920s for the sake of his children's education.

In 1930 he returned to Edinburgh as Assistant Curator of the Royal Botanic Gardens. In 1934, he became full Curator (Head Keeper) of the Gardens. During the early 1930s, he was also responsible for laying out the grounds of Astley Ainslie Hospital. During his curatorship he lived in the East Gate Lodge with his wife, Emily. During this period (1930–54) fellow botanist John Macqueen Cowan worked alongside Cooper.

In 1942 he was elected a Fellow of the Royal Society of Scotland. His proposers included his uncle, by this time Sir William Wright Smith, Thomas Rowatt and Ernest Shearer.

He retired in 1950 and moved with his wife, Emily, to Westcliff-on-Sea in Essex. He died at Southend-on-Sea on 31 January 1962, aged 71.

== Species described by Cooper ==
The standard author abbreviation R.E.Cooper is used to indicate this person as the author when citing a botanical name.

- Primula calderiana Balf.f. & R.E.Cooper
- Primula xanthopia Balf.f. & R.E.Cooper
- Rhododendron agripeplum Balf.f. & R.E.Cooper
- Rhododendron papillatum Balf.f. & R.E.Cooper

== Species bearing his name ==
- Parnassia cooperi W.E.Evans
- Pedicularis cooperi P.C.Tsoong
- Poa cooperi Noltie
- Primula cooperi Balf.f.
- Rubus cooperi D.G.Long
