= Inverewe Garden =

Botanical garden in Scotland

Coordinates: 57°46′30″N 5°36′15″W

Designations

Inventory of Gardens and Designed Landscapes in Scotland
- Official name: Inverewe
- Designated: 30 June 1987
- Reference no.: GDL00226

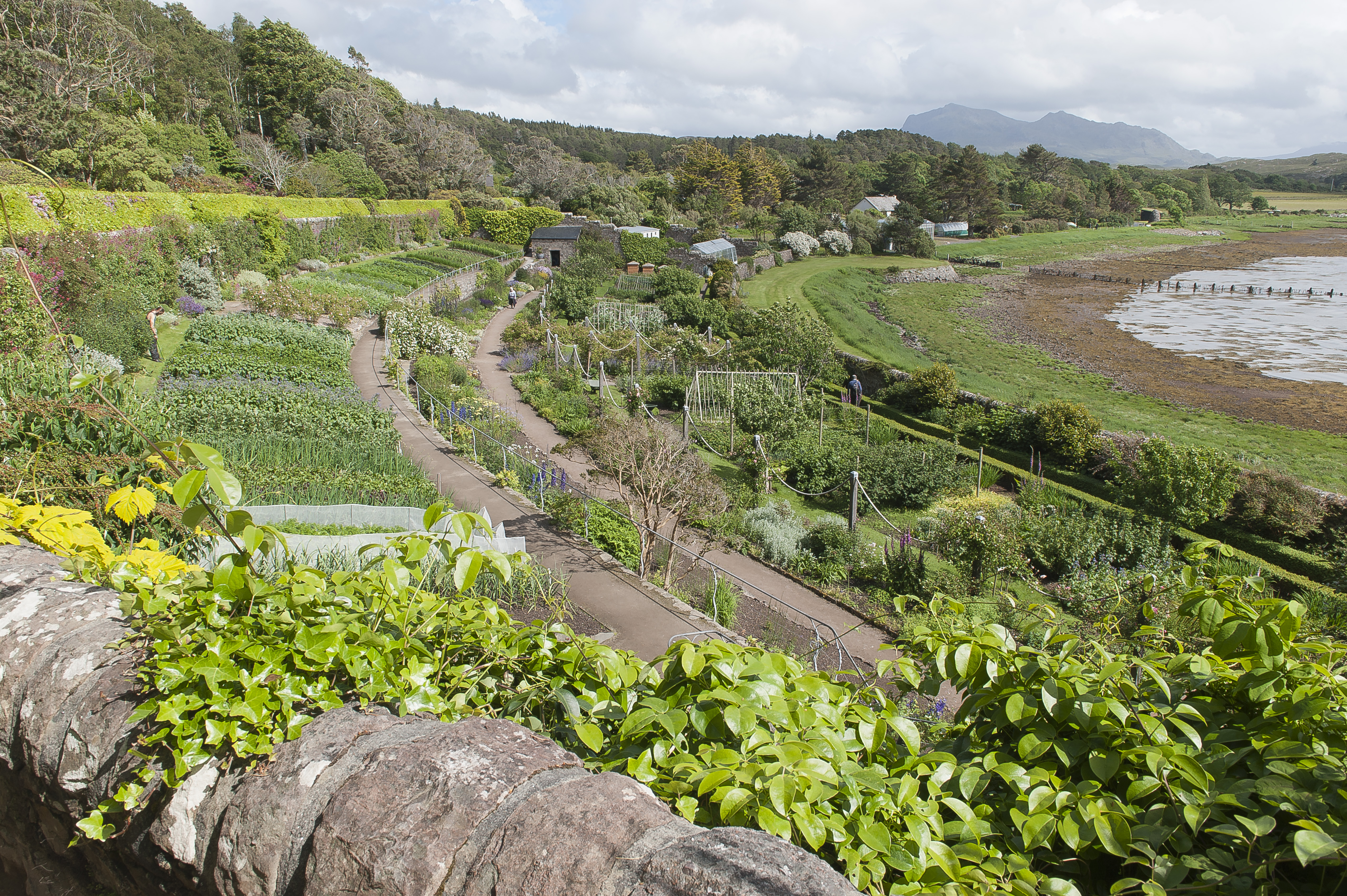
Inverewe Gardens

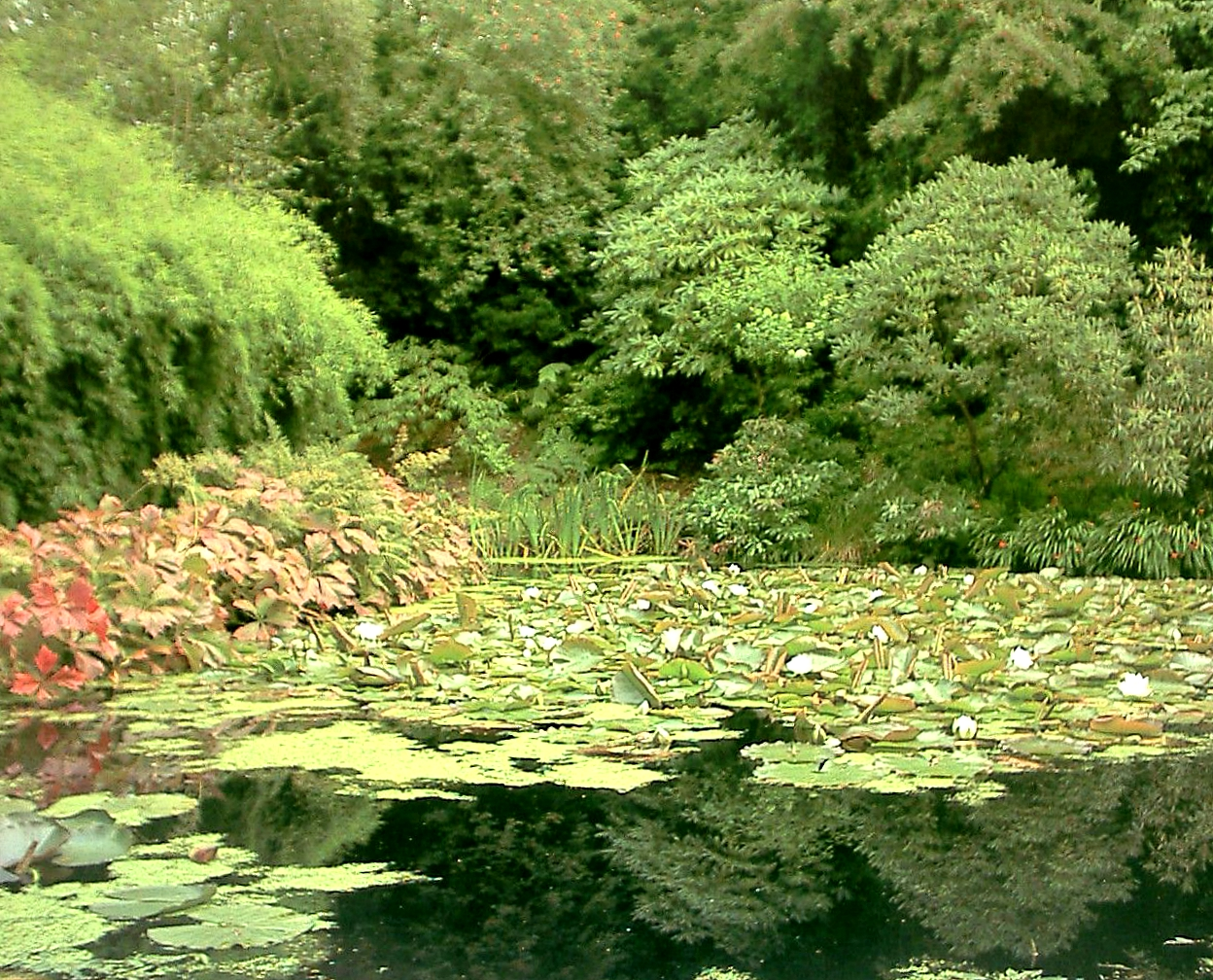
A pond in Inverewe Garden

Inverewe Garden is a botanical garden in Wester Ross in the Scottish Highlands. It is located just to the north of Poolewe in Wester Ross, and is noted for the breadth of its collection.

The garden was created from barren land in 1862 by Osgood Mackenzie on the 850-hectare (2,100-acre) estate bought for him by his mother. Initially the challenges were to provide a wind break and soil. To solve the problems, he planted a mixture of large trees and shrubs e.g. Corsican Pine, Douglas Fir, Rhododendrons etc. Having done so his vision was to grow as many exotic plants as possible; this he achieved until his death in 1922.

The original Inverewe Lodge was destroyed by fire in 1914 and replaced in 1937 by the current Inverewe House. The Garden covers some 20 hectares (50 acres) and has over 2,500 exotic plants and flowers. There is a further 800 hectares (2,000 acres) of land managed for recreation and conservation.

The garden and estate has been the property of the National Trust for Scotland since it was given to the Trust along with a generous endowment for its future upkeep by Osgood's daughter Mairi Sawyer in 1952.

The garden continues to be developed by the small garden team. There are currently 10 full-time gardeners. Inverewe has a noteworthy rhododendron collection in flower throughout the year. The garden also has a large collection of Erythroniums. These flower in Spring and in recent years the garden has promoted an Erythronium festival.

In summer the walled garden and borders come into their own with many exotic plants from all over the world which grow here thanks to the influence of the North Atlantic current. Even in winter Inverewe is colourful as the bark of many rhododendrons is beautifully and delicately coloured and the collection of native and non-native trees, including Wollemi trees, add to the variety.

== Notable staff ==
- Douglas Mackay Henderson Administrator from 1987 to 1992
