= William Wright Smith =

Scottish botanist (1875–1956)

Professor Sir William Wright Smith FRS FRSE FLS VMH
- Born: 2 February 1875; Lochmaben
- Died: 15 December 1956 (aged 81)
- Education: University of Edinburgh
- Awards: FRS (1945); FRSE (1919); Fellow of the Linnean Society; Victoria Medal of Honour (1925); The Veitch Memorial Medal (1930)
- Scientific career
- Fields: Botany
- Workplaces: University of Edinburgh; Royal Botanic Garden Edinburgh
- Author abbrev. (botany)

Sir William Wright Smith (2 February 1875 Lochmaben, Dumfriesshire – 15 December 1956) was a Scottish botanist and horticulturalist.

== Life ==
He was born at Parkend farm near Lochmaben in Dumfriesshire, the son of James T. Smith, a farmer.

He was educated at Dumfries Academy and then studied at University of Edinburgh where he graduated MA around 1895. He then undertook postgraduate studies at the University of Toulouse.

He rose to become from 1922 to 1956 the Queen's Botanist in Scotland, the 10th Regius Keeper of the Royal Botanic Garden Edinburgh, Regius Professor of Botany at the University of Edinburgh.

Aberdeen University granted him an honorary doctorate (LLD). He was elected President of the Botanical Society of Edinburgh for 1922–25 and 1935–36.

He was elected a Fellow of the Royal Society of Edinburgh in 1919, his proposers being Sir Isaac Bayley Balfour, James Hartley Ashworth and Donald Cameron McIntosh. He served as secretary to the society 1923–28, vice-president 1928–31, president 1944-49 and won the society's Makdougall-Brisbane Prize for 1940–42.

He was knighted by King George V in 1932 and elected a fellow of the Royal Society in 1945.

== Research ==
From 1907 until 1910, Smith went travelling in northern India with his nephew and ward, Roland Edgar Cooper FRSE, collecting samples in Sikkim, Nepal, Tibet and Bhutan. Cooper later took over from Smith in his role of Head Curator of the Royal Botanic Garden Edinburgh.

Smith is known for his research on:

- Beesia
- Photinia loriformis
- Platanthera oreophila
- Primula alpicola

== Family ==
He was married to Emma Wiedhofft. In 1905 they took guardianship of their nephew, Roland Edgar Cooper. They went on to have children of their own, three daughters named Lesley, Alison and Peggy.
