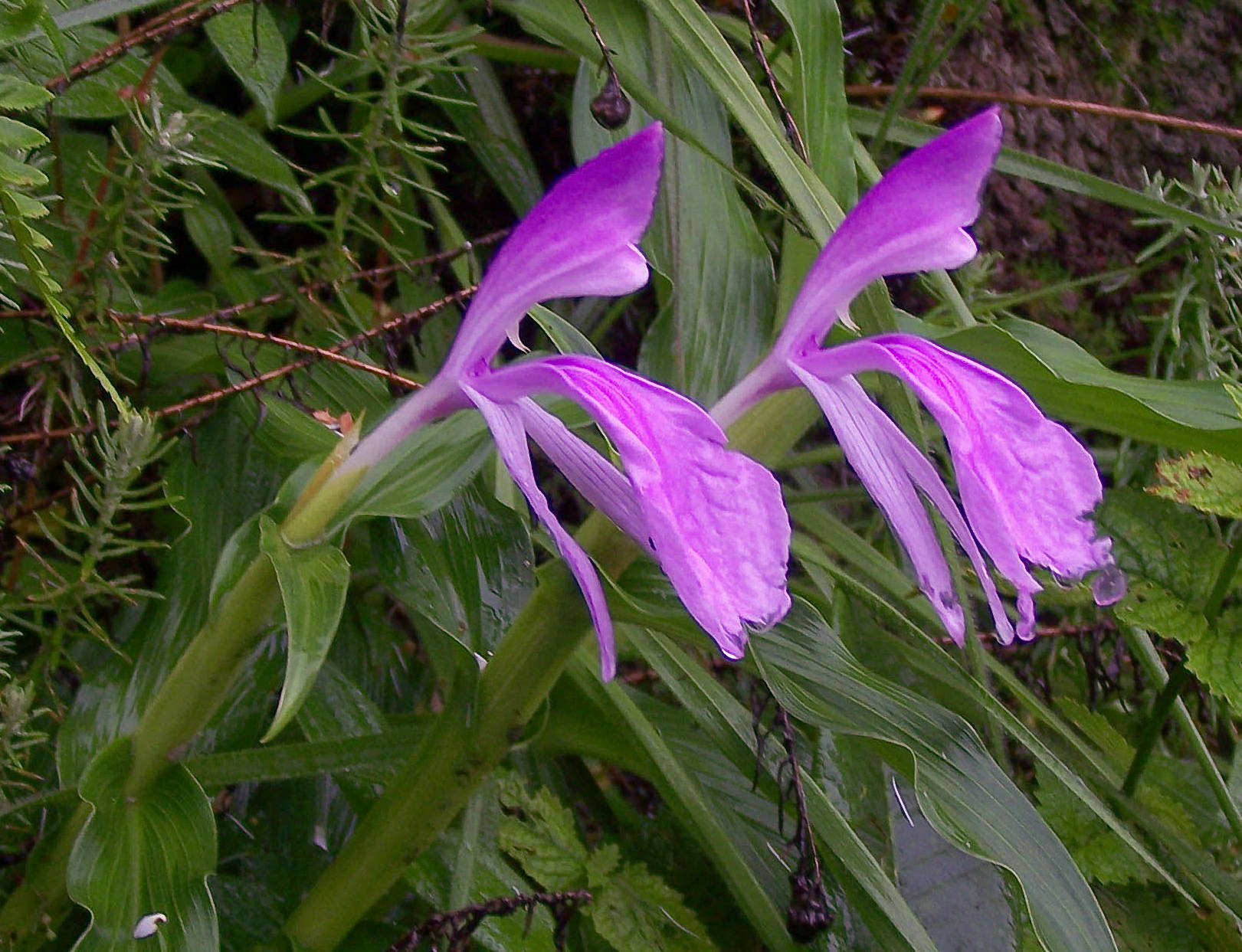
- In Nepal

Scientific classification
- Kingdom: Plantae
- Clade: Embryophytes
- Clade: Tracheophytes
- Clade: Angiosperms
- Clade: Monocots
- Clade: Commelinids
- Order: Zingiberales
- Family: Zingiberaceae
- Genus: Roscoea
- Species: R. purpurea

Binomial name
- Roscoea purpurea Sm.

= Roscoea purpurea =

Species of flowering plant

Roscoea purpurea is a perennial herbaceous plant occurring in the Himalayas, particularly Nepal. Most members of the ginger family (Zingiberaceae), to which it belongs, are tropical, but species of Roscoea grow in much colder mountainous regions. It is sometimes grown as an ornamental plant in gardens.

== Description ==
Roscoea purpurea is a perennial herbaceous plant. Like all members of the genus Roscoea, it dies back each year to a short vertical rhizome, to which are attached the tuberous roots. When growth begins again, "pseudostems" are produced: structures which resemble stems but are actually formed from the tightly wrapped bases (sheaths) of its leaves. R. purpurea can grow to over 50 cm tall, with wide leaves and a stout pseudostem, although the height varies. The leaf sheaths are pale green or may have a dark reddish-purple tinge.

The stem (peduncle) of the flower spike is hidden by the leaf sheaths. The flowers are the largest of any species in the genus. They are usually purple to mauve in colour, although white- and red-flowered forms have been found in Nepal.

Each flower has the typical structure for Roscoea (see the diagrams in that article). There is a tube-shaped outer calyx. Next the three petals (the corolla) form a tube slightly longer than the calyx, terminating in three lobes, an upright hooded central lobe and two slightly smaller side lobes. Inside the petals are structures formed from four sterile stamens (staminodes): two lateral staminodes form what appear to be small upright petals; two central staminodes are partially fused at the base to form a lip or labellum.

== Taxonomy ==
Roscoea purpurea was named by the English botanist James Edward Smith in 1806; it is the type species of the genus. The generic name honours Smith's friend William Roscoe, the founder of the Liverpool Botanic Garden (remnants of which can now be found at Croxteth Hall). The specific epithet refers to the colour of the flowers.

== Evolution and phylogeny ==
The family Zingiberaceae is mainly tropical in distribution. The unusual mountainous distribution of Roscoea may have evolved relatively recently and be a response to the uplift taking place in the region in the last 50 million years or so due to the collision of the Indian and Asian tectonic plates.

Species of Roscoea divide into two clear groups, a Himalayan clade and a "Chinese" clade (which includes some species from outside China). The two clades correspond to a geographical separation, their main distributions being divided by the Brahmaputra River as it flows south at the end of the Himalayan mountain chain. It has been suggested that the genus may have originated in this area and then spread westwards along the Himalayas and eastwards into the mountains of China and its southern neighbours. R. purpurea falls into the Himalayan clade as would be expected from its distribution.

== Distribution and habitat ==
Roscoea purpurea is native to the Himalayas, and in particular Nepal. It occurs in a range of habitats, both damp and dry. It has been found in alpine grassland, rock faces, terraced walls, clearings and woodland edges; sometimes exposed to the full sun and sometimes in the shade of other herbaceous plants, shrubs and trees.

== Pollination ==
Roscoea purpurea is pollinated by the long tongue fly (Philoliche longirostris), which is an obligate pollinator for R. purpurea. Philoliche longirostris is the only species of long-tongued fly distributed in the Himalayas and has the longest proboscis among all members of the Tabanidae. The seasonal prevalence of this fly synchronizes closely with the peak blooming period of R. purpurea. Pollen transfer occurs when a fly pushes against the staminal appendages that extend from the base of the stamen at the entrance of the corolla tube. This action causes the anther and the style and stigma to descend and touch the fly's back.

== Cultivation ==
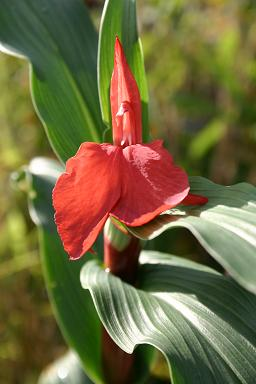
Roscoea purpurea f. rubra (formerly 'Red Gurkha') (AGM)

Jill Cowley notes that "for many years" a different species, R. auriculata, was grown in gardens under the name R. purpurea. She provides a number of distinguishing features, which include the auriculate nature of the leaves of R. auriculata, the bright purple colour of its flowers rather than the paler colours of typical R. purpurea, the relatively shorter white lateral staminodes of R. auriculata, and the latter's deflexed (bent back) labellum.

R. purpurea like other Roscoea species and cultivars, is often grown in rock gardens. Plants generally require a relatively sunny position with moisture-retaining but well-drained soil. As they do not appear above ground until late spring or even early summer, they escape frost damage in regions where subzero temperatures occur. When grown at Royal Botanic Gardens, Kew, R. purpurea emerges from the ground only in June, flowering from late July to early September. It requires shade for part of the day.

R. purpurea was included in a trial of Roscoea held by the Royal Horticultural Society (RHS) from 2009 to 2011. It proved hardy (rating H4, i.e. hardy anywhere in the British Isles). One form and three cultivars were given the Award of Garden Merit (AGM):

- R. purpurea f. rubra (formerly 'Red Gurkha') – red-orange flowers
- R. purpurea 'Dalai Lama' – flowers have pale violet labellums with deeper violet throats with white markings; leaf sheaths deep red
- R. purpurea 'Helen Lamb' – strong growing; many flowers similar in colour to the typical form of the species
- R. purpurea 'Red Neck' – pale flowers; floral bracts and sheaths strongly marked with red.

A red-flowered form found in Nepal was initially named R. purpurea 'Red Gurkha'. However, plants in cultivation vary, particularly in the colour of the leaf sheaths, which may be plain green or marked with red, so that the RHS considered that a form name was more appropriate, and the AGM was given to R. purpurea f. rubra. Red is a flower colour not otherwise found in the genus.

For propagation, see Roscoea: Cultivation.

Some cultivars

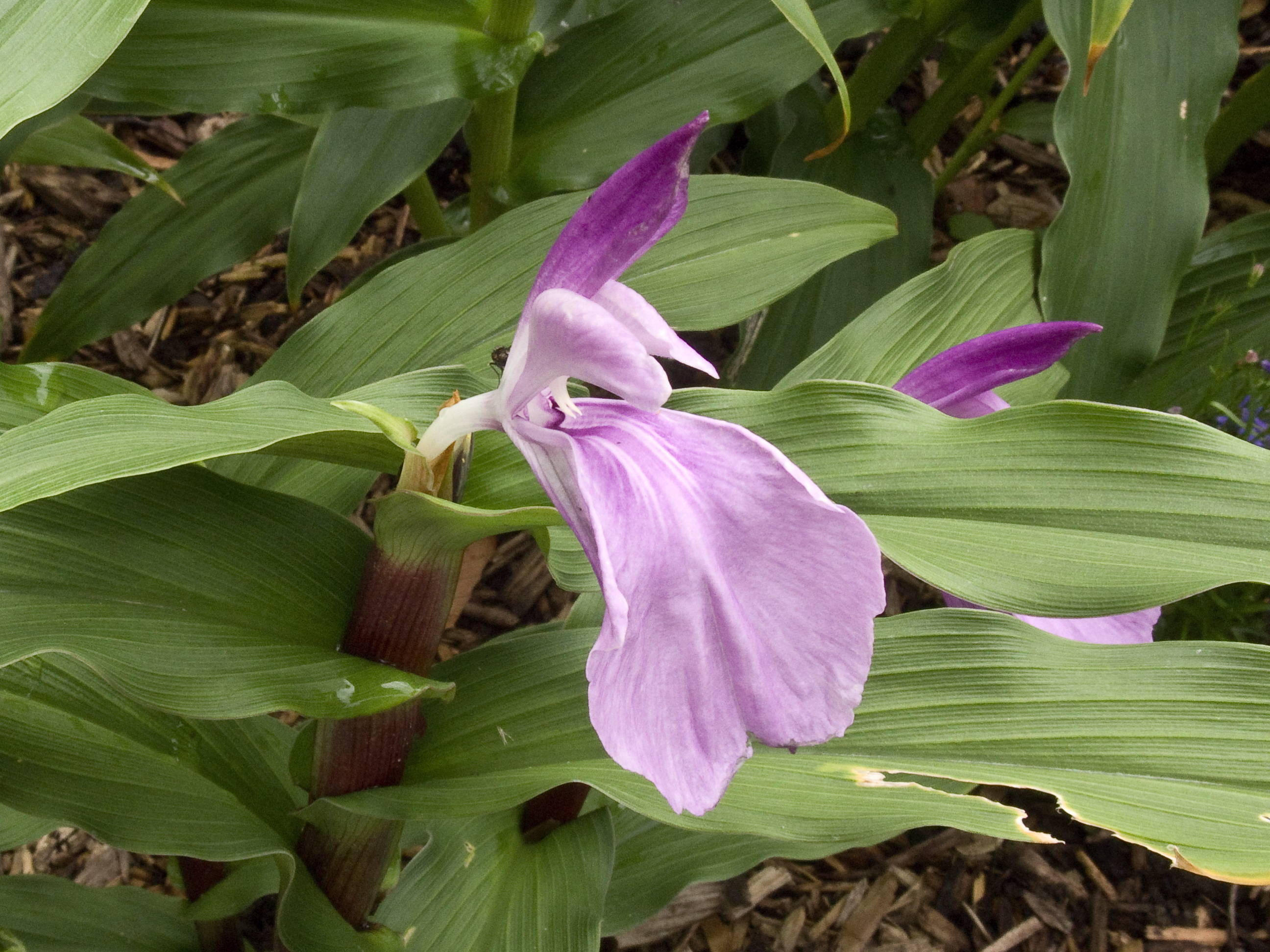
'Dalai Lama' (AGM)

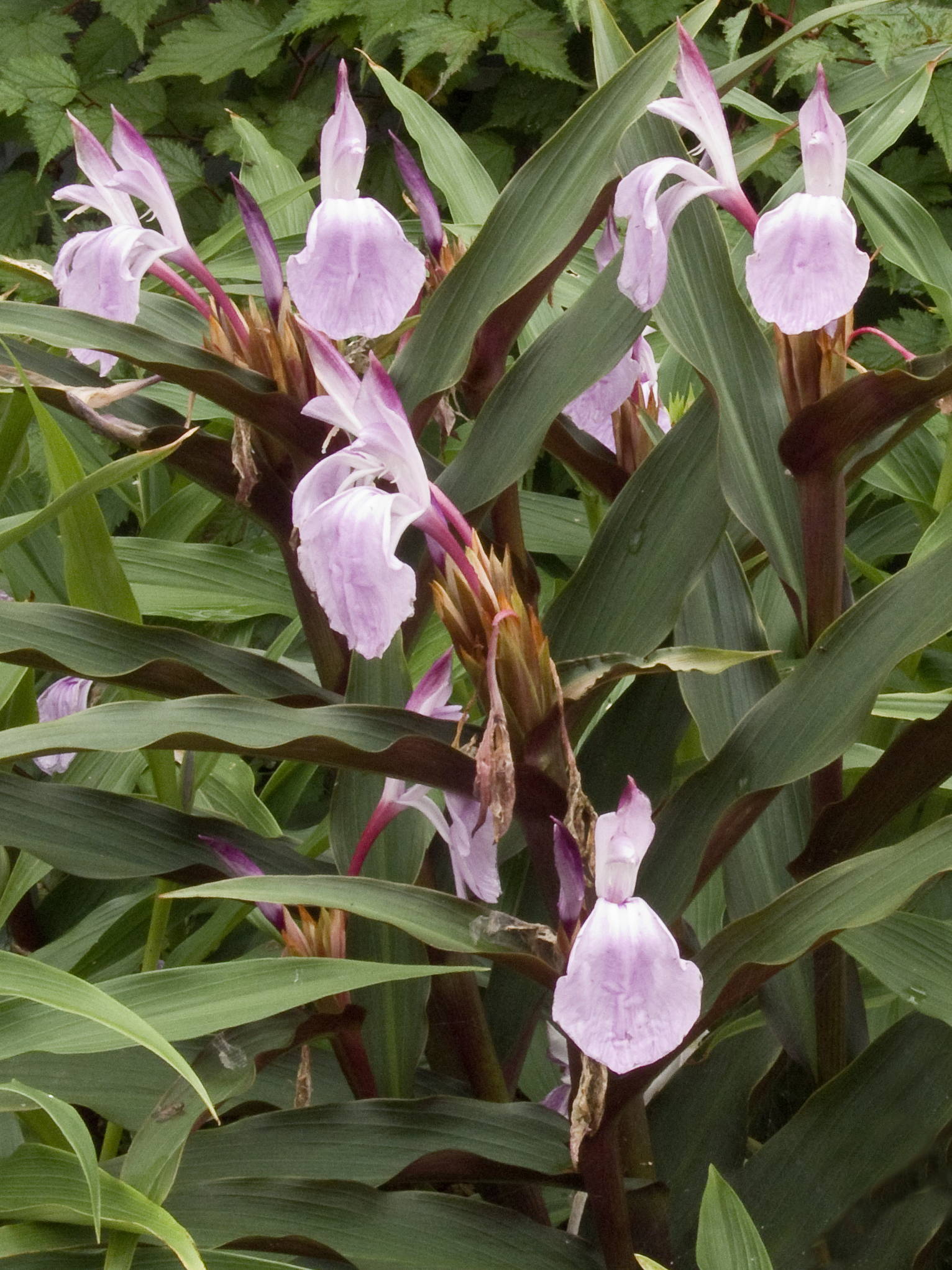
'Brown Peacock'

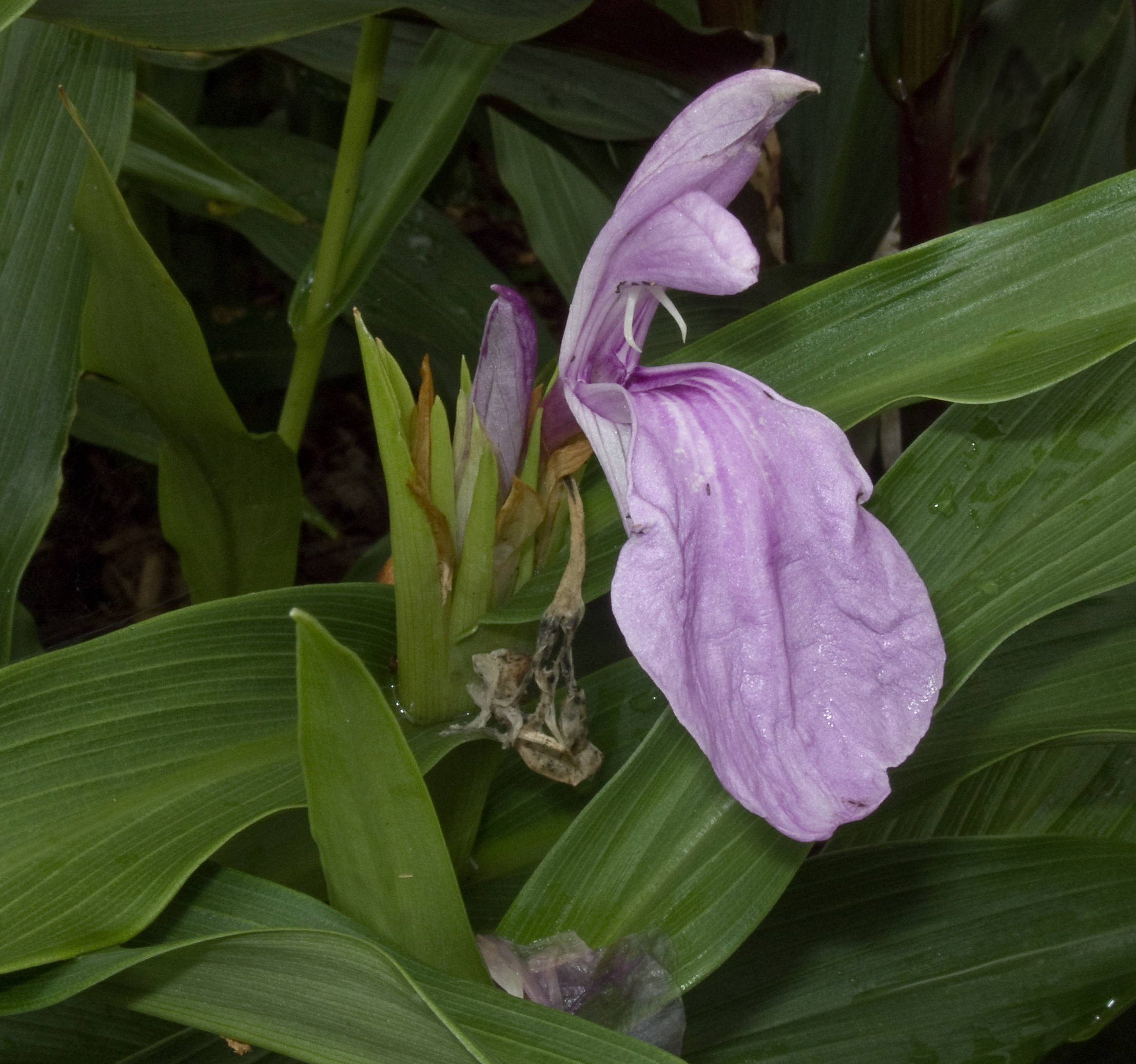
'Nico'

== Bibliography ==
- Cowley, Jill & Baker, William (1994), "247. Roscoea purpurea 'Red Gurkha'", Curtis's Botanical Magazine, 11 (3): 104–109, doi:10.1111/j.1467-8748.1994.tb00419.x
- Cowley, Jill (2007), The genus Roscoea, Royal Botanic Gardens, Kew, ISBN 978-1-84246-134-1
