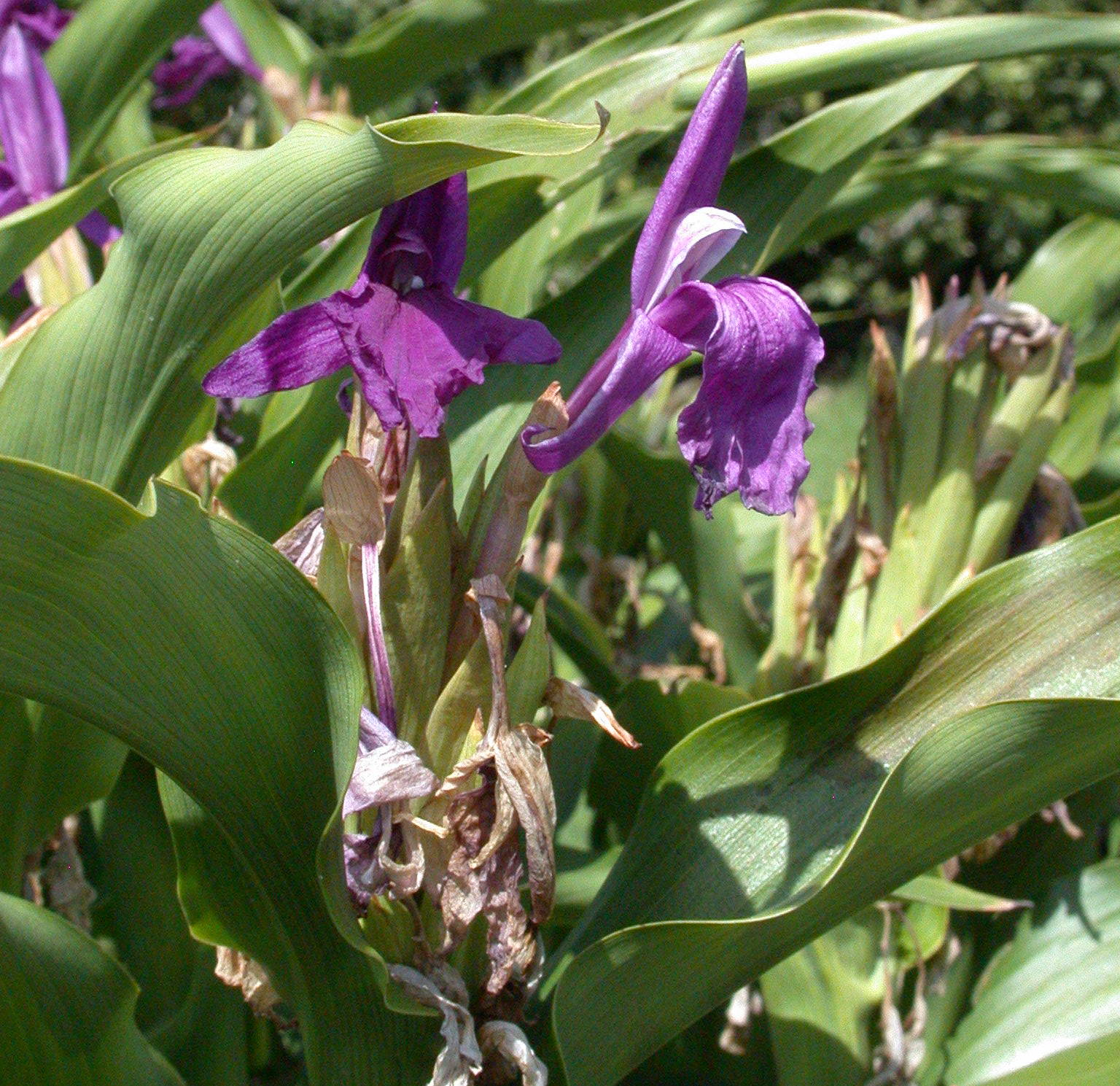

Scientific classification
- Kingdom: Plantae
- Clade: Tracheophytes
- Clade: Angiosperms
- Clade: Monocots
- Clade: Commelinids
- Order: Zingiberales
- Family: Zingiberaceae
- Genus: Roscoea
- Species: R. auriculata

Binomial name
- Roscoea auriculata K.Schum.

= Roscoea auriculata =

Species of plant

Roscoea auriculata is a perennial herbaceous plant occurring in the eastern Himalayas, in Tibet, Bhutan, Nepal and Sikkim. Most members of the ginger family (Zingiberaceae), to which it belongs, are tropical, but R. auriculata, like other species of Roscoea, grows in much colder mountainous regions. It is sometimes grown as an ornamental plant in gardens.

== Description ==
Roscoea auriculata is a perennial herbaceous plant. Like all members of the genus Roscoea, it dies back each year to a short vertical rhizome, to which the tuberous roots are attached. When growth begins again, "pseudostems" are produced: structures which resemble stems but are actually formed from the tightly wrapped bases (sheaths) of its leaves. R. auriculata is usually 20–40 cm tall, with three to seven leaves. The blade of the leaf (the part free from the pseudostem) is 7.5–20 cm long by 2–2.5 cm wide. The leaf sheath is smooth (glabrous) and purple in colour. At the junction of the blade and sheath there are ear-shaped (auriculate) outgrowths.

In its native habitats, R. auriculata flowers between June and August. The stem (peduncle) of the flower spike does not emerge from the leaf sheaths. Several purple or white flowers are produced. Membranous bracts, 2–2.5 cm long subtend the flowers.

Each flower has the typical structure for Roscoea (see that article for labelled images). There is a tube-shaped outer calyx, about 3.5 cm long. Next the three petals (the corolla) form a tube longer than the calyx, terminating in three lobes, each about 3–3.5 cm long: an upright central lobe and two slightly shorter side lobes. Inside the petals are structures formed from four sterile stamens (staminodes): two lateral staminodes form what appear to be small white petals, about 1.5–2 cm long, upright and hooded; two central staminodes are fused at the base to form a lip or labellum, about 3.3–4.8 cm long by 3 cm wide. This is bent backwards and split at the end into two lobes.

The single functional stamen has a linear anther, about 1 cm long, borne on a 1 cm long filament. A short spur is formed from the connective tissue between the two capsules of the anther. After flowering, a capsule 2–3 cm in length is formed containing brown seeds.

== Taxonomy ==
The species was named by Karl Moritz Schumann, a German botanist, in 1904. In 1966, H. Hara reduced it to a variety of a different species, Roscoea purpurea var. auriculata. However, more recent sources have maintained it as a separate species.

The specific epithet auriculata refers to the two ear-shaped (auriculate) outgrowths at the junctions of the leaf blades and sheaths.

== Evolution and phylogeny ==
The family Zingiberaceae is mainly tropical in distribution. The unusual mountainous distribution of Roscoea may have evolved relatively recently and be a response to the uplift taking place in the region in the last 50 million years or so due to the collision of the Indian and Asian tectonic plates.

Species of Roscoea divide into two clear groups, a Himalayan clade and a "Chinese" clade (which includes some species from outside China). The two clades correspond to a geographical separation, their main distributions being divided by the Brahmaputra River as it flows south at the end of the Himalayan mountain chain. It has been suggested that the genus may have originated in this area and then spread westwards along the Himalayas and eastwards into the mountains of China and its southern neighbours. R. auriculata falls into the Himalayan clade as would be expected from its distribution. It appears to be closely related to R. alpina.

== Distribution and habitat ==
Roscoea auriculata occurs in grasslands, between 2,400 and 2,700 metres in the Himalayan mountains of Tibet, Bhutan, Nepal and Sikkim.

== Cultivation ==
Jill Cowley notes that R. auriculata has been grown in gardens "for many years" under the name of a different species, R. purpurea. She provides a number of distinguishing features, which include the auriculate nature of the leaves, the bright purple colour of the flowers rather than the paler colours of R. purpurea, the relatively shorter white lateral staminodes of R. auriculata, and the latter's deflexed (bent back) labellum.

R. auriculata, like other Roscoea species and cultivars, is often grown in rock gardens. Plants generally require a relatively sunny position with moisture-retaining but well-drained soil. As they do not appear above ground until late spring or even early summer, they escape frost damage in regions where subzero temperatures occur. R. auriculata has been described as one of the "most commonly grown and easy species". When grown at the Royal Botanic Gardens, Kew, it was given a position which was sunny in the morning but shaded in the afternoon; it should not be planted in full sun or in too hot a position. Deep violet-purple and white forms are in cultivation. A form with large, richly coloured flowers is grown as Roscoea auriculata 'Floriade'.

R. auriculata and some of its cultivars were included in a trial of Roscoea held by the Royal Horticultural Society from 2009 to 2011. All proved hardy (rating H4, i.e. hardy anywhere in the British Isles), flowering between July and September. The Award of Garden Merit was given to the species and its cultivar 'Summer Deep Purple'. The cultivar is similar to the more typical forms of the species but taller, with many flowers and a long flowering season.

For propagation, see Roscoea: Cultivation.
