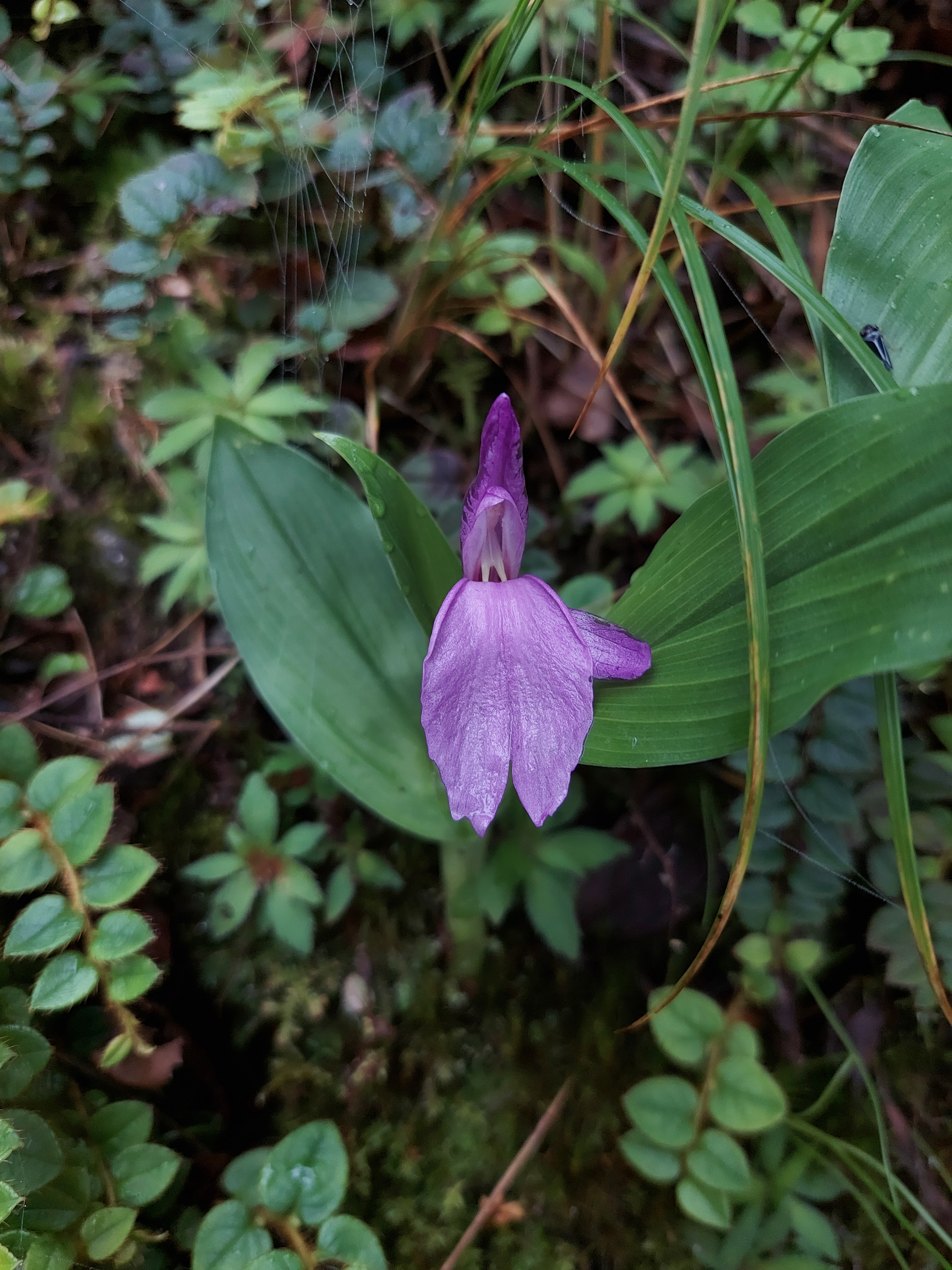

Scientific classification
- Kingdom: Plantae
- Clade: Tracheophytes
- Clade: Angiosperms
- Clade: Monocots
- Clade: Commelinids
- Order: Zingiberales
- Family: Zingiberaceae
- Genus: Roscoea
- Species: R. bhutanica

Binomial name
- Roscoea bhutanica Ngamr.

= Roscoea bhutanica =

Species of flowering plant

Roscoea bhutanica is a perennial herbaceous plant native to the mountains of Bhutan and Tibet. Formerly regarded as part of Roscoea tibetica, it was recognized as a separate species in 2000. Most members of the ginger family (Zingiberaceae), to which it belongs, are tropical, but R. bhutanica, like other species of Roscoea, grows in much colder mountainous regions.

== Description ==
Roscoea bhutanica is a perennial herbaceous plant. Like all members of the genus Roscoea, it dies back each year to a short vertical rhizome, to which are attached the tuberous roots. When growth begins again, "pseudostems" are produced: structures which resemble stems but are actually formed from the tightly wrapped bases (sheaths) of its leaves. R. bhutanica is one of the smaller members of the genus; plants are 8–14 cm tall, with around four to eight or more leaves, the first two to four being bladeless, the others with smooth (glabrous) blades 4–21 cm long by 1–1.6 cm wide. The leaves are clustered together at the base.

The stem (peduncle) of the flower spike is hidden by the leaf sheaths. Bracts some 4.5–8 cm long by 1–1.6 wide enclose the flowers, which are purple and appear one at a time, just above the leaves.

Each flower has the typical structure for Roscoea (see the diagrams in that article). There is a tube-shaped outer calyx, 5–6.5 cm long with a two-toothed apex. Next the three petals (the corolla) form a tube which is usually about 1 cm longer than the calyx at 5–6.5 cm and terminates in three lobes, a narrow upright central lobe, about 2.3–2.6 cm long and 1.1–1.3 cm wide, and two narrower side lobes, each 2.4–2.8 cm long by 4–6 mm wide. Inside the petals are structures formed from four sterile stamens (staminodes): two lateral staminodes form what appear to be narrow upright petals, 1.6–1.9 cm long; two central staminodes are fused to form a lip or labellum, about 2.5–3.2 cm by 1.6–2 cm, which is slightly bent downwards and divided into two lobes for less than half its length.

The single functional stamen has a white anther, about 6–7 mm long, above pointed spurs formed from the connective tissue between the two capsules of the anther. The style is pinkish-white with a white stigma. The ovary is about 1–1.7 cm long.

== Taxonomy ==
Roscoea bhutanica was first described scientifically in 2000 in a paper which gives the author of the binomial name as Chatchai Ngamriabsakul, a Thai botanist. The specific epithet bhutanica refers to the main area of distribution of the species, namely Bhutan.

As explained further below, the species was originally considered to be part of R. tibetica.

== Evolution and phylogeny ==
The family Zingiberaceae is mainly tropical in distribution. The unusual mountainous distribution of Roscoea may have evolved relatively recently and be a response to the uplift taking place in the region in the last 50 million years or so due to the collision of the Indian and Asian tectonic plates.

Species of Roscoea divide into two clear groups, a Himalayan clade and a "Chinese" clade (which includes some species from outside China). The two clades correspond to a geographical separation, their main distributions being divided by the Brahmaputra River as it flows south at the end of the Himalayan mountain chain. It has been suggested that the genus may have originated in this area and then spread westwards along the Himalayas and eastwards into the mountains of China and its southern neighbours.

R. tibetica was formerly thought to be unique in occurring on both sides of the south-flowing section of the Brahmaputra River. However, genetic analysis in 2000 showed that plants to the west, in Bhutan, were distinct from those to the east, in China. The former were placed in a new species, R. bhutanica. R. bhutanica falls into the Himalayan clade whereas R. tibetica belongs to the Chinese clade, as would be expected from their respective distributions.

The two species are superficially similar, in that they are both small and have a tight group of basal leaves. Young plants of the two species are not easily distinguished, but later it can be seen that R. tibetica retains a rosette of leaves, whereas R. bhutanica develops leaves in two opposite rows.

== Distribution and habitat ==
Roscoea bhutanica is native to mountains in Bhutan and southern Tibet. It has been found at altitudes of between 2,100 and 3,500 metres, in wooded valleys and forest clearings.
