= List of Rhododendron species =

This List of Rhododendron species includes species of the genus Rhododendron, which is in the plant family Ericaceae. Depending on the source, there are anywhere from 800 to over 1,100 wild species. The vast majority of Rhododendron species are native to the eastern Himalaya and southeast Tibet, along with the islands of Java, Sumatra, Borneo, New Guinea, and the Philippines. The rest are broadly spread throughout the northern hemisphere in relatively small isolated populations, including Japan, northwestern North America, the Appalachian, and the Caucasus Mountains.

Rhododendron has eight traditionally accepted subgenera based on morphology, still the consensus taxonomy used by most authorities: Azaleastrum; Candidastrum; Hymenanthes; Mumeazalea; Pentanthera; Rhododendron; Therorhodion; Tsutsusi. Hymenanthes, with approximately 225 species, and subgenus Rhododendron, with approx. 400 species, comprise what gardeners typically describe as "Rhododendrons." Two subgenera are generally known to gardeners as "Azaleas", and include many fewer true species: Pentanthera, which comprises the deciduous azaleas, and Tsutsusi, which includes evergreen azaleas.

Modern cladistic analysis, based on nuclear genetics, proposes changes in the classification of species within subgenera. These proposals are based on at least three different studies, with no changes proposed within subgenus Rhododendron and its sections. The major proposed changes are: to make section Choniastrum (originally in subgenus Azaleastrum) a separate Choniastrum subgenus; to combine sections Ponticum, Pentanthera, and the species Rhododendron canadense in subgenus Hymenanthes; subgenus Azaleastrum to include the former subgenera Tsutsusi, Mumeazalea, Candidastrum, and Menziesa, along with former sections Viscidula, Azaleastrum, Sciadorhodion, and the species Rhododendron vaseyi.

As of 2024 the Plants of the World Online database lists 1091 accepted species and natural hybrids, all of which are listed here.

== A ==
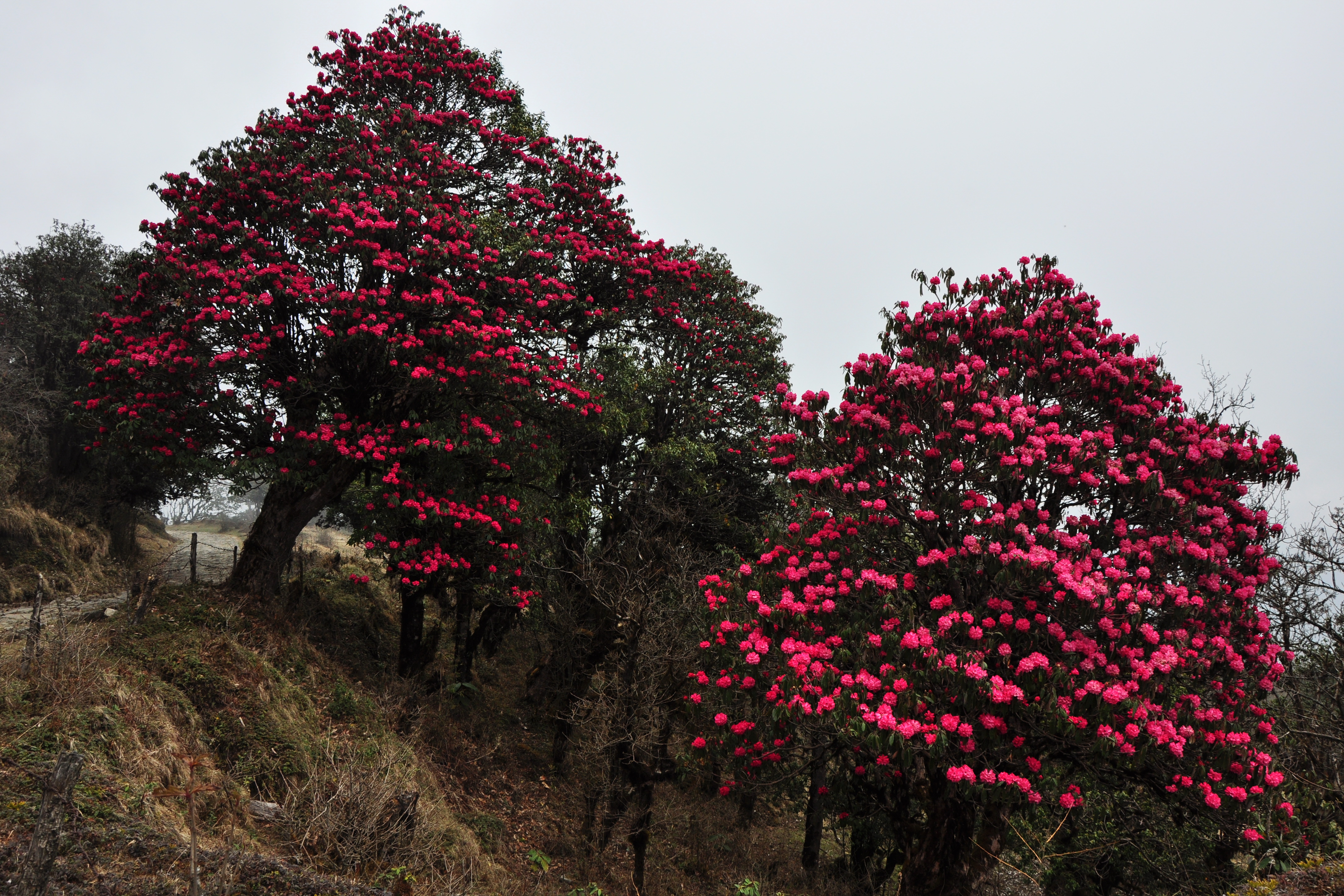
Rhododendron arboreum

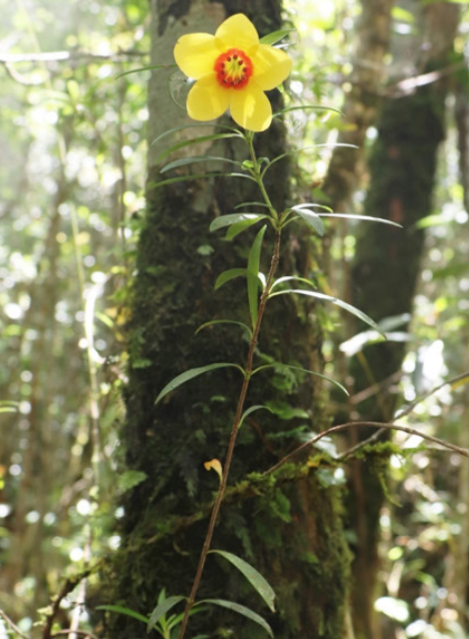
Rhododendron astrophorum

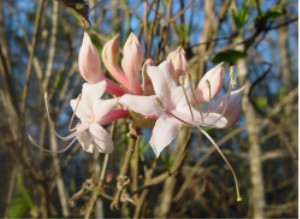
Rhododendron atlanticum

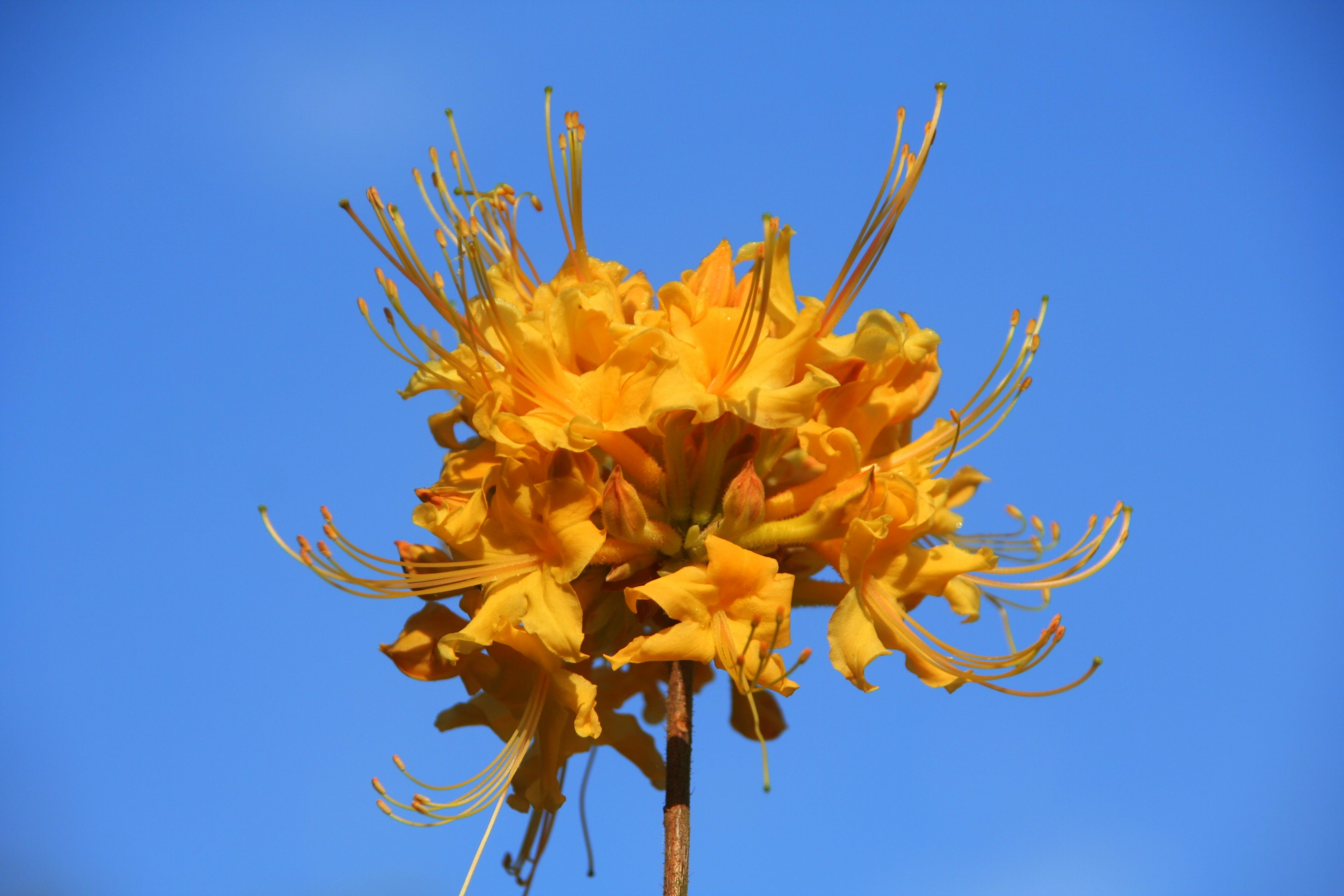
Rhododendron austrinum

- Rhododendron aberconwayi Cowan
- Rhododendron abhayae L.K.Rai
- Rhododendron abietifolium Sleumer
- Rhododendron acrophilum Merr. & Quisumb.
- Rhododendron acuminatum Hook.f.
- Rhododendron adamsii Rehder
- Rhododendron adenanthum M.Y.He
- Rhododendron adenobracteum X.F.Gao & Y.L.Peng
- Rhododendron adenogynum Diels
- Rhododendron adenopodum Franch.
- Rhododendron adenosum (Cowan & Davidian) Davidian
- Rhododendron adinophyllum Merr.
- Rhododendron aequabile J.J.Sm.
- Rhododendron aeruginosum Hook.f.
- Rhododendron afghanicum Aitch. & Hemsl.
- Rhododendron aganniphum Balf.f. & Kingdon-Ward
- Rhododendron × agastum Balf.f. & W.W.Sm.
- Rhododendron agathodaemonis J.J.Sm.
- Rhododendron alabamense Rehder
- Rhododendron albertsenianum Forrest ex Balf.f.
- Rhododendron albiflorum Hook.
- Rhododendron alborugosum Argent & J.Dransf.
- Rhododendron albrechtii Maxim.
- Rhododendron album Blume
- Rhododendron alternans Sleumer
- Rhododendron alticola Sleumer
- Rhododendron alutaceum Balf.f. & W.W.Sm.
- Rhododendron amagianum (Makino) Makino ex H.Hara
- Rhododendron amakusaense (K.Takada ex T.Yamaz.) T.Yamaz.
- Rhododendron amandum Cowan
- Rhododendron ambiguum Hemsl.
- Rhododendron amesiae Rehder & E.H.Wilson
- Rhododendron × amoenum (Lindl.) Planch.
- Rhododendron amundsenianum Hand.-Mazz.
- Rhododendron anagalliflorum Wernham
- Rhododendron andrineae Danet
- Rhododendron angiense J.J.Sm.
- Rhododendron angulatum J.J.Sm.
- Rhododendron annae Franch.
- Rhododendron anthopogon D.Don
- Rhododendron anthopogonoides Maxim.
- Rhododendron anthosphaerum Diels
- Rhododendron anwheiense E.H.Wilson
- Rhododendron aperantum Balf.f. & Kingdon-Ward
- Rhododendron apiense Argent
- Rhododendron apoanum Stein
- Rhododendron apradae U.Rai & Lama
- Rhododendron araiophyllum Balf.f. & W.W.Sm.
- Rhododendron arborescens (Pursh) Torr.
- Rhododendron arboreum Sm.
- Rhododendron archboldianum Sleumer
- Rhododendron ardii Hutabarat, Mambrasar & Mustaqim
- Rhododendron arenicola Sleumer
- Rhododendron arfakianum Becc.
- Rhododendron argipeplum Balf.f. & R.E.Cooper
- Rhododendron argyrophyllum Franch.
- Rhododendron arizelum Balf.f. & Forrest
- Rhododendron armitii F.M.Bailey
- Rhododendron arunachalense D.F.Chamb. & Rae
- Rhododendron asperrimum Sleumer
- Rhododendron asperulum Kingdon-Ward
- Rhododendron asperum J.J.Sm.
- Rhododendron assamicum W.Bull
- Rhododendron asterochnoum Diels
- Rhododendron astrophorum M.N.Tamayo, Y.P.Ang & A.S.Rob.
- Rhododendron atjehense Sleumer
- Rhododendron atlanticum (Ashe) Rehder
- Rhododendron atrichum Argent
- Rhododendron atropunicum H.P.Yang
- Rhododendron atropurpureum Sleumer
- Rhododendron atrovirens Franch.
- Rhododendron augustinei Hemsl.
- Rhododendron aureodorsale (W.P.Fang ex J.Q.Fu) Y.P.Ma & J.Nielsen
- Rhododendron aureum Georgi
- Rhododendron auriculatum Hemsl.
- Rhododendron aurigeranum Sleumer
- Rhododendron auritum Tagg
- Rhododendron austrinum (Small) Rehder
- Rhododendron awatosaense Minamit. & Yonek.

== B ==
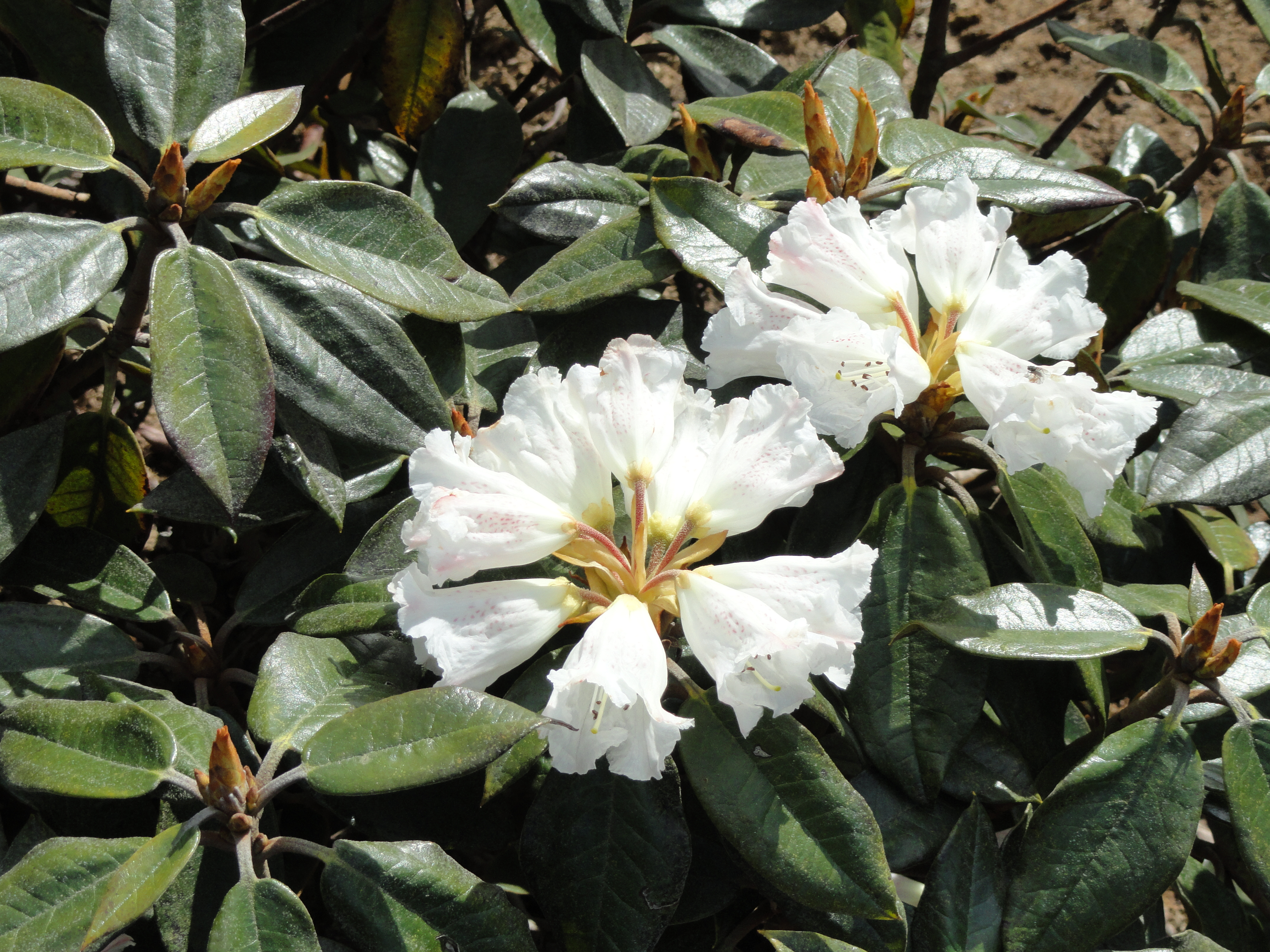
Rhododendron bureavii

- Rhododendron bachii H.Lév.
- Rhododendron baconii Argent, A.Lamb & Phillipps
- Rhododendron baenitzianum Lauterb.
- Rhododendron bagobonum H.F.Copel.
- Rhododendron baihuaense Y.P.Ma
- Rhododendron baileyi Balf.f.
- Rhododendron bailiense Y.P.Ma, C.Q.Zhang & D.F.Chamb.
- Rhododendron bainaense Xiang Chen & C.H.Yang
- Rhododendron bainbridgeanum Tagg & Forrest
- Rhododendron × bakeri (W.P.Lemmon & McKay) H.H.Hume
- Rhododendron balangense W.P.Fang
- Rhododendron balfourianum Diels
- Rhododendron bamaense Z.J.Zhao
- Rhododendron banghamiorum (J.J.Sm.) Sleumer
- Rhododendron barbatum Wall. ex G.Don
- Rhododendron barkamense D.F.Chamb.
- Rhododendron basilicum Balf.f. & W.W.Sm.
- Rhododendron × bathyphyllum Balf.f. & Forrest
- Rhododendron beanianum Cowan
- Rhododendron beccarii Sleumer
- Rhododendron beesianum Diels
- Rhododendron bellissimum D.F.Chamb.
- Rhododendron benhallii Craven
- Rhododendron benomense Rafidah & A.C.Elliott
- Rhododendron beyerinckianum Koord.
- Rhododendron bhutanense D.G.Long & Bowes Lyon
- Rhododendron biappendiculatum Craven
- Rhododendron bijiangense T.L.Ming
- Rhododendron bivelatum Balf.f.
- Rhododendron blackii Sleumer
- Rhododendron bloembergenii Sleumer
- Rhododendron boninense Nakai
- Rhododendron bonvalotii Franch.
- Rhododendron boothii Nutt.
- Rhododendron borneense (J.J.Sm.) Argent, A.Lamb & Phillipps
- Rhododendron brachyantherum Warb. ex P.Sarasin & Sarasin
- Rhododendron brachyanthum Franch.
- Rhododendron brachycarpum D.Don ex G.Don
- Rhododendron brachygynum H.F.Copel.
- Rhododendron brachypodarium Sleumer
- Rhododendron brachypodum W.P.Fang & P.S.Liu
- Rhododendron bracteatum Rehder & E.H.Wilson
- Rhododendron brassii Sleumer
- Rhododendron brentelii Argent
- Rhododendron brevicaudatum R.C.Fang & S.S.Chang
- Rhododendron brevinerve Chun & W.P.Fang
- Rhododendron breviperulatum Hayata
- Rhododendron brevipes Sleumer
- Rhododendron brevipetiolatum M.Y.Fang
- Rhododendron bryophilum Sleumer
- Rhododendron bullifolium Sleumer
- Rhododendron bulu Hutch.
- Rhododendron × bungonishikii Komatsu
- Rhododendron bureavii Franch.
- Rhododendron bureavioides Balf.f.
- Rhododendron × burjaticum Malyschev
- Rhododendron burmanicum Hutch.
- Rhododendron burttii P.Woods
- Rhododendron buruense J.J.Sm.
- Rhododendron buxifolium H.Low ex Hook.f.
- Rhododendron buxoides Sleumer

== C ==
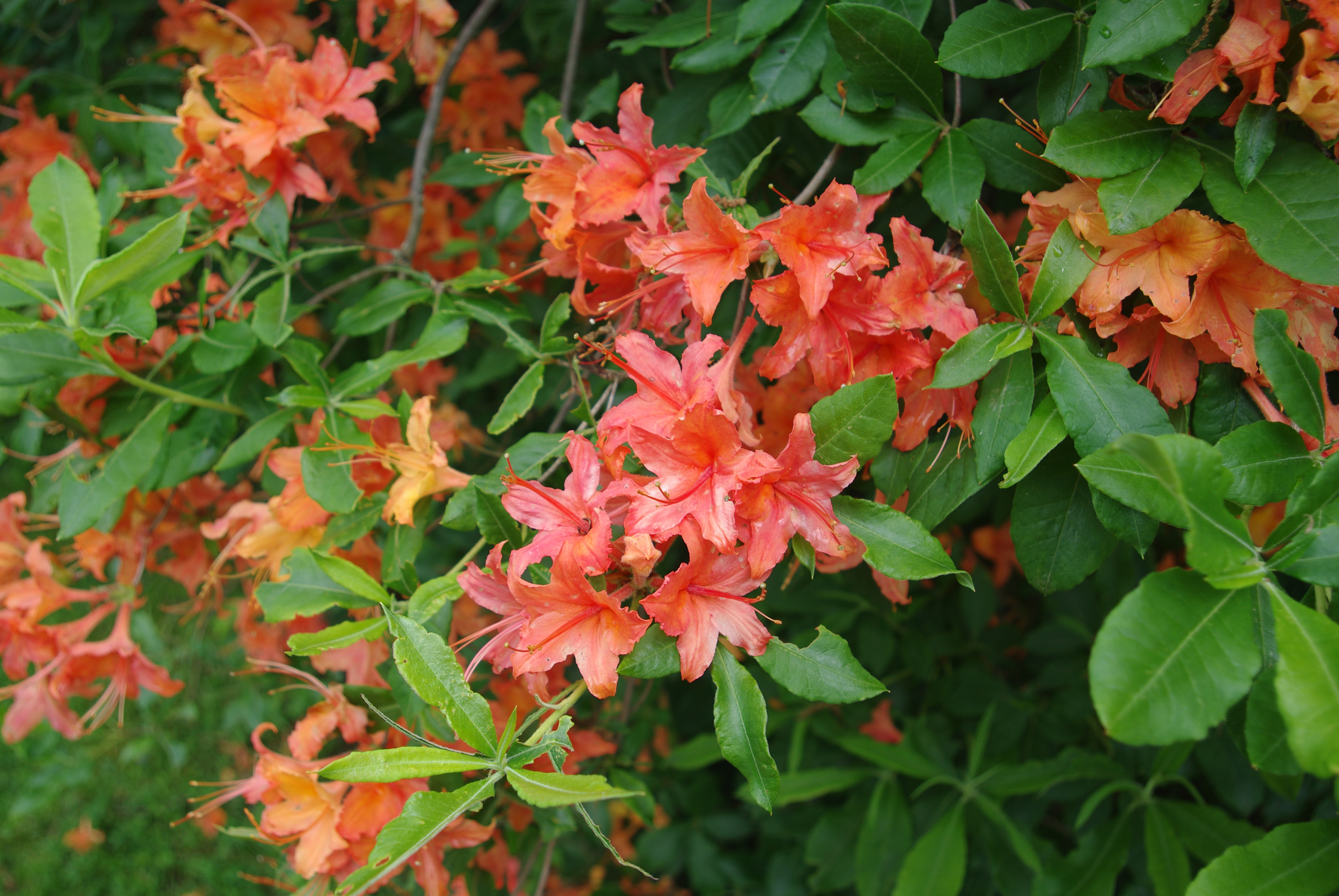
Rhododendron calendulaceum

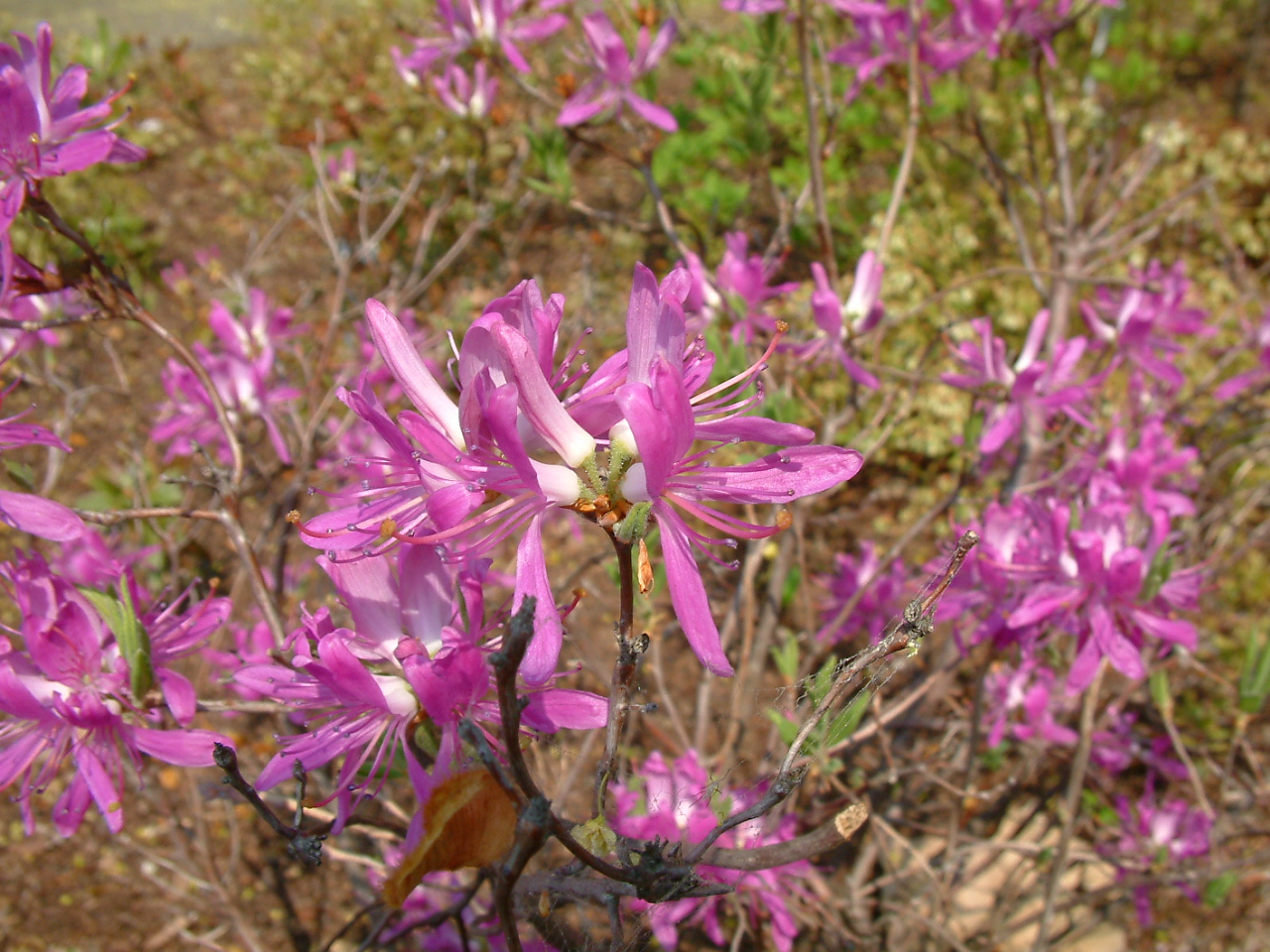
Rhododendron canadense

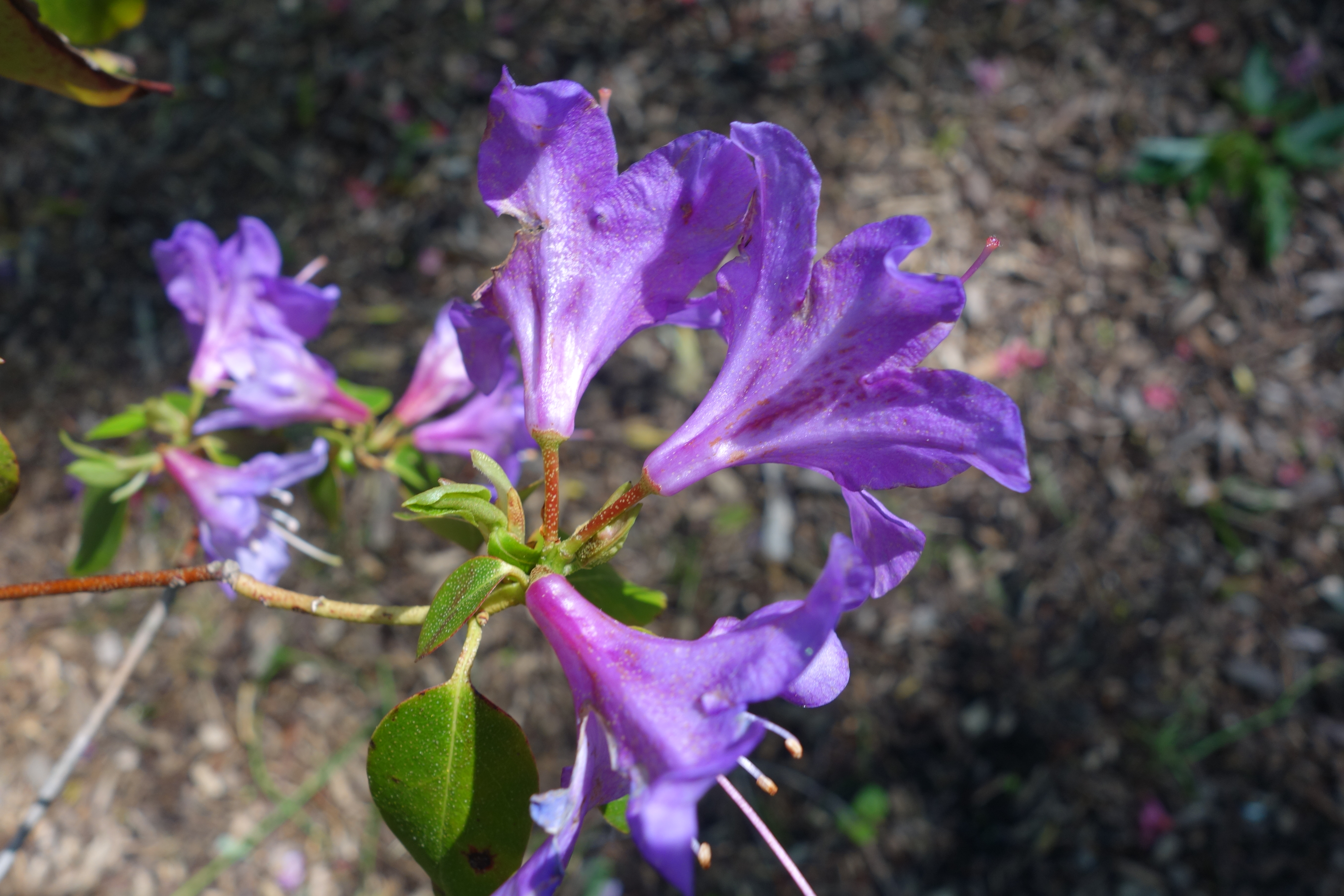
Rhododendron capitatum

- Rhododendron caesium Hutch.
- Rhododendron caespitosum Sleumer
- Rhododendron calendulaceum (Michx.) Torr.
- Rhododendron caliginis Kores
- Rhododendron callimorphum Balf.f. & W.W.Sm.
- Rhododendron calophytum Franch.
- Rhododendron calosanthes Sleumer
- Rhododendron calostrotum Balf.f. & Kingdon-Ward
- Rhododendron calvescens Balf.f. & Forrest
- Rhododendron camelliiflorum Hook.f.
- Rhododendron campanulatum D.Don
- Rhododendron campylocarpum Hook.f.
- Rhododendron campylogynum Franch.
- Rhododendron camtschaticum Pall.
- Rhododendron canadense (L.) Torr.
- Rhododendron × candelabrum Hook.f.
- Rhododendron canescens (Michx.) Sweet
- Rhododendron capellae Kores
- Rhododendron capitatum Maxim.
- Rhododendron carneum Hutch.
- Rhododendron carrii Sleumer
- Rhododendron carringtoniae F.Muell.
- Rhododendron carstensense Wernham
- Rhododendron catacosmum Balf.f. ex Tagg
- Rhododendron catawbiense Michx.
- Rhododendron caucasicum Pall.
- Rhododendron cavaleriei H.Lév.
- Rhododendron celebicum (Blume) DC.
- Rhododendron cephalanthum Franch.
- Rhododendron cerasinum Tagg
- Rhododendron cernuum Sleumer
- Rhododendron chamaethomsonii (Tagg) Cowan & Davidian
- Rhododendron × chamaezelum Balf.f. & Forrest
- Rhododendron chamahense Rafidah
- Rhododendron chamberlainii Craven
- Rhododendron championiae Hook.
- Rhododendron changii (W.P.Fang) W.P.Fang
- Rhododendron chaoanense T.C.Wu & P.C.Tam
- Rhododendron × charadzeae A.P.Khokhr. & Mazurenko
- Rhododendron charitopes Balf.f. & Farrer
- Rhododendron charitostreptum Balf.f. & Kingdon-Ward
- Rhododendron chevalieri Dop ex A.Chev.
- Rhododendron chihsinianum Chun & W.P.Fang
- Rhododendron chilanshanense Kurash.
- Rhododendron chiliangense S.S.Ying
- Rhododendron chionanthum Tagg & Forrest
- Rhododendron christi F.Först.
- Rhododendron christianiae Sleumer
- Rhododendron chrysocalyx H.Lév. & Vaniot
- Rhododendron chrysodoron Tagg ex Hutch.
- Rhododendron chrysolepis Hutch. & Kingdon-Ward
- Rhododendron chunienii Chun & W.P.Fang
- Rhododendron chunii W.P.Fang
- Rhododendron ciliatum Hook.f.
- Rhododendron ciliicalyx Franch.
- Rhododendron ciliilobum Sleumer
- Rhododendron ciliipes Hutch.
- Rhododendron cinchoniflorum Sleumer
- Rhododendron cinerascens Sleumer
- Rhododendron cinnabarinum Hook.f.
- Rhododendron circinnatum Cowan & Kingdon-Ward
- Rhododendron citriniflorum Balf.f. & Forrest
- Rhododendron citrinum (Hassk.) Hassk.
- Rhododendron clementinae Forrest ex W.W.Sm.
- Rhododendron cochlearifolium Xiang Chen & Jia Y.Huang
- Rhododendron cockburnii (Argent, A.Lamb & Phillipps) Craven
- Rhododendron codonanthum Balf.f. & Forrest
- Rhododendron coelicum Balf.f. & Farrer
- Rhododendron coeloneurum Diels
- Rhododendron coelorum Wernham
- Rhododendron colemanii R.F.Mill.
- Rhododendron collettianum Aitch. & Hemsl.
- Rhododendron columbianum (Piper) Harmaja
- Rhododendron comisteum Balf.f. & Forrest
- Rhododendron commonae F.Först.
- Rhododendron commutatum Sleumer
- Rhododendron comparabile Sleumer
- Rhododendron complexum Balf.f. & W.W.Sm.
- Rhododendron comptum C.H.Wright
- Rhododendron concinnoides Hutch. & Kingdon-Ward
- Rhododendron concinnum Hemsl.
- Rhododendron coriaceum Franch.
- Rhododendron × coriifolium Sleumer
- Rhododendron cornu-bovis Sleumer
- Rhododendron correoides J.J.Sm.
- Rhododendron coryanum Tagg & Forrest
- Rhododendron cowanianum Davidian
- Rhododendron coxianum Davidian
- Rhododendron crassifolium Stapf
- Rhododendron crassimedium P.C.Tam
- Rhododendron crassistylum M.Y.He
- Rhododendron crassum Franch.
- Rhododendron cravenii Danet
- Rhododendron crenulatum Hutch. ex Sleumer
- Rhododendron cretaceum P.C.Tam
- Rhododendron crinigerum Franch.
- Rhododendron cruttwellii Sleumer
- Rhododendron cuffeanum Craib ex Hutch.
- Rhododendron culminicola F.Muell.
- Rhododendron cumberlandense E.L.Braun
- Rhododendron cuneatum W.W.Sm.
- Rhododendron cuneifolium Stapf
- Rhododendron curviflorum J.J.Sm.
- Rhododendron cuspidellum Sleumer
- Rhododendron cyanocarpum (Franch.) W.W.Sm.
- Rhododendron cyrtophyllum Wernham

== D ==
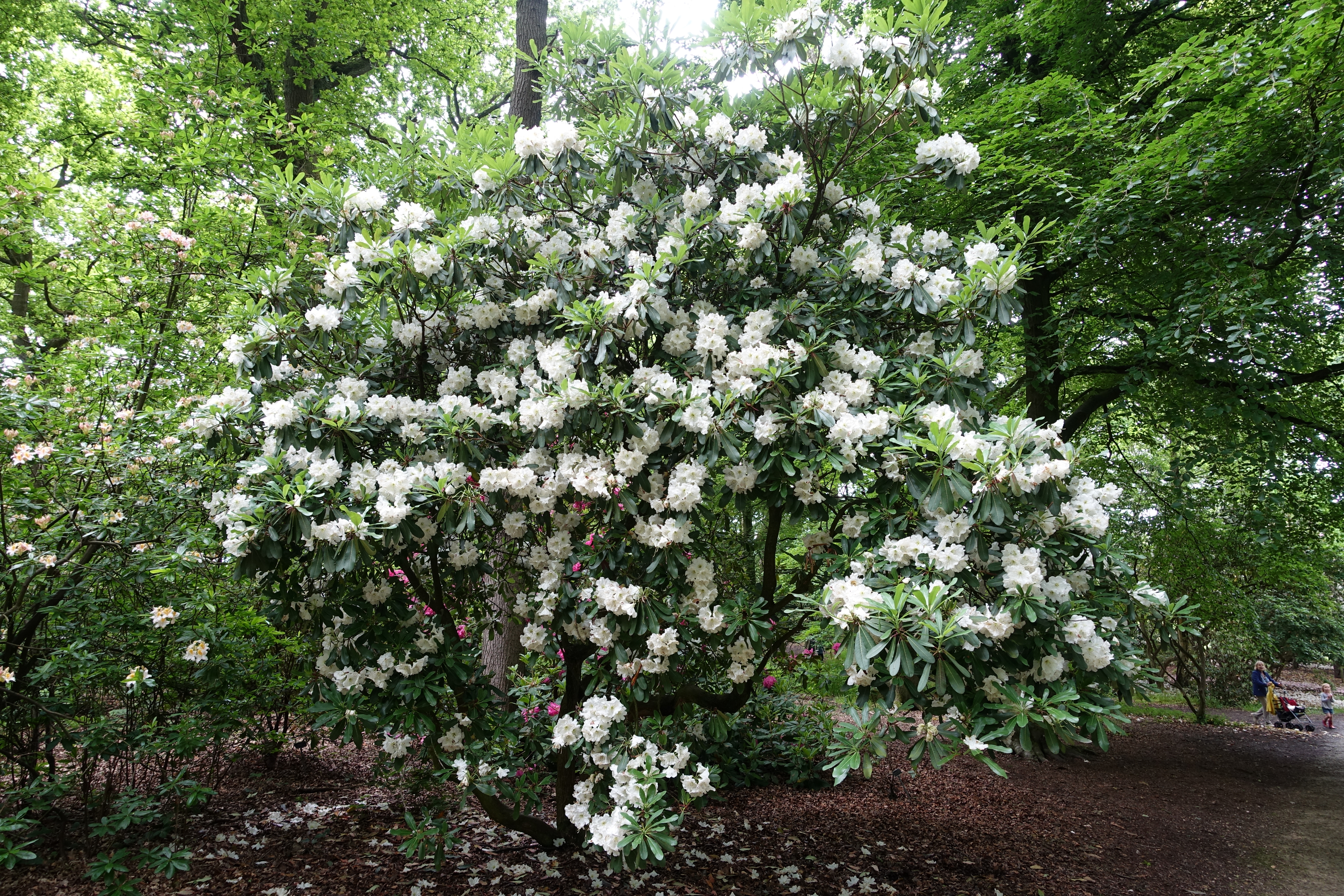
Rhododendron decorum

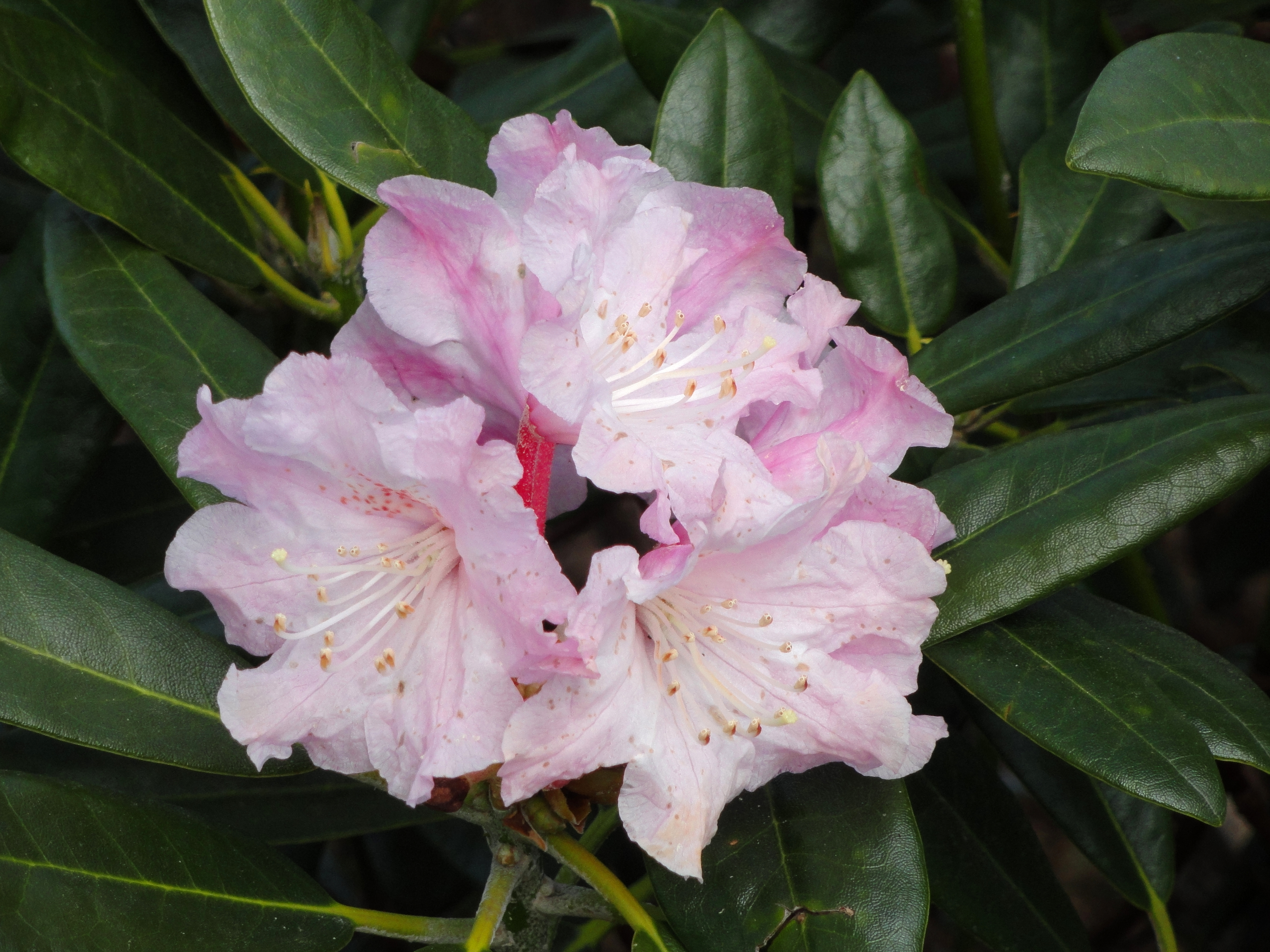
Rhododendron degronianum

- Rhododendron dachengense G.Z.Li
- Rhododendron dalhousieae Hook.f.
- Rhododendron danbaense L.C.Hu
- Rhododendron dasycladoides Hand.-Mazz.
- Rhododendron dasypetalum Balf.f. & Forrest
- Rhododendron datiandingense Z.J.Feng
- Rhododendron dauricum L.
- Rhododendron davidii Franch.
- Rhododendron davidsonianum Rehder & E.H.Wilson
- Rhododendron × davisianum R.I.Milne
- Rhododendron dawuense H.P.Yang
- Rhododendron dayaoshanense L.M.Gao & D.Z.Li
- Rhododendron dayiense M.Y.He
- Rhododendron decipiens Lacaita
- Rhododendron declivatum Ching & H.P.Yang
- Rhododendron decorum Franch.
- Rhododendron degronianum Carrière
- Rhododendron dekatanum Cowan
- Rhododendron delavayi Franch.
- Rhododendron delicatulum Sleumer
- Rhododendron dendricola Hutch.
- Rhododendron dendrocharis Franch.
- Rhododendron densifolium K.M.Feng
- Rhododendron denudatum H.Lév.
- Rhododendron detersile Franch.
- Rhododendron × detonsum Balf.f. & Forrest
- Rhododendron detznerianum Sleumer
- Rhododendron dianthosmum Sleumer
- Rhododendron dichroanthum Diels
- Rhododendron dielsianum Schltr.
- Rhododendron dignabile Cowan
- Rhododendron dilatatum Miq.
- Rhododendron dimitrum Balf.f. & Forrest
- Rhododendron × diphrocalyx Balf.f.
- Rhododendron discolor Franch.
- Rhododendron disterigmoides Sleumer
- Rhododendron × diversiflorum Danet
- Rhododendron diversipilosum (Nakai) Harmaja
- Rhododendron × duclouxii H.Lév.
- Rhododendron dumicola Tagg & Forrest
- Rhododendron durionifolium Becc.
- Rhododendron dutartrei Danet

== E ==
- Rhododendron eastmanii Kron & Creel
- Rhododendron ebianense M.Y.Fang
- Rhododendron eclecteum Balf.f. & Forrest
- Rhododendron edanoi Merr. & Quisumb.
- Rhododendron × edgarianum Rehder & E.H.Wilson
- Rhododendron edgeworthii Hook.f.
- Rhododendron eheinense M.Y.He & Z.J.Zhao
- Rhododendron elegantulum Tagg & Forrest
- Rhododendron elliottii Watt ex Brandis
- Rhododendron emarginatum Hemsl. & E.H.Wilson
- Rhododendron englerianum Koord.
- Rhododendron × enomotoi T.Yamaz.
- Rhododendron × epilosum (J.J.Sm.) Argent
- Rhododendron erastum Balf.f. & Forrest
- Rhododendron ericoides H.Low ex Hook.f.
- Rhododendron eriobotryoides Xiang Chen & Jia Y.Huang
- Rhododendron eriocarpum (Hayata) Nakai
- Rhododendron erosipetalum J.J.Sm.
- Rhododendron erosum Cowan
- Rhododendron × erythrocalyx Balf.f. & Forrest
- Rhododendron esetulosum Balf.f. & Forrest
- Rhododendron euchroum Balf.f. & Kingdon-Ward
- Rhododendron eudoxum Balf.f. & Forrest
- Rhododendron eurysiphon Tagg & Forrest
- Rhododendron evelyneae Danet
- Rhododendron exasperatum Tagg
- Rhododendron excelsum A.Chev.
- Rhododendron extrorsum J.J.Sm.
- Rhododendron exuberans (Sleumer) Argent
- Rhododendron eymae Sleumer

== F ==
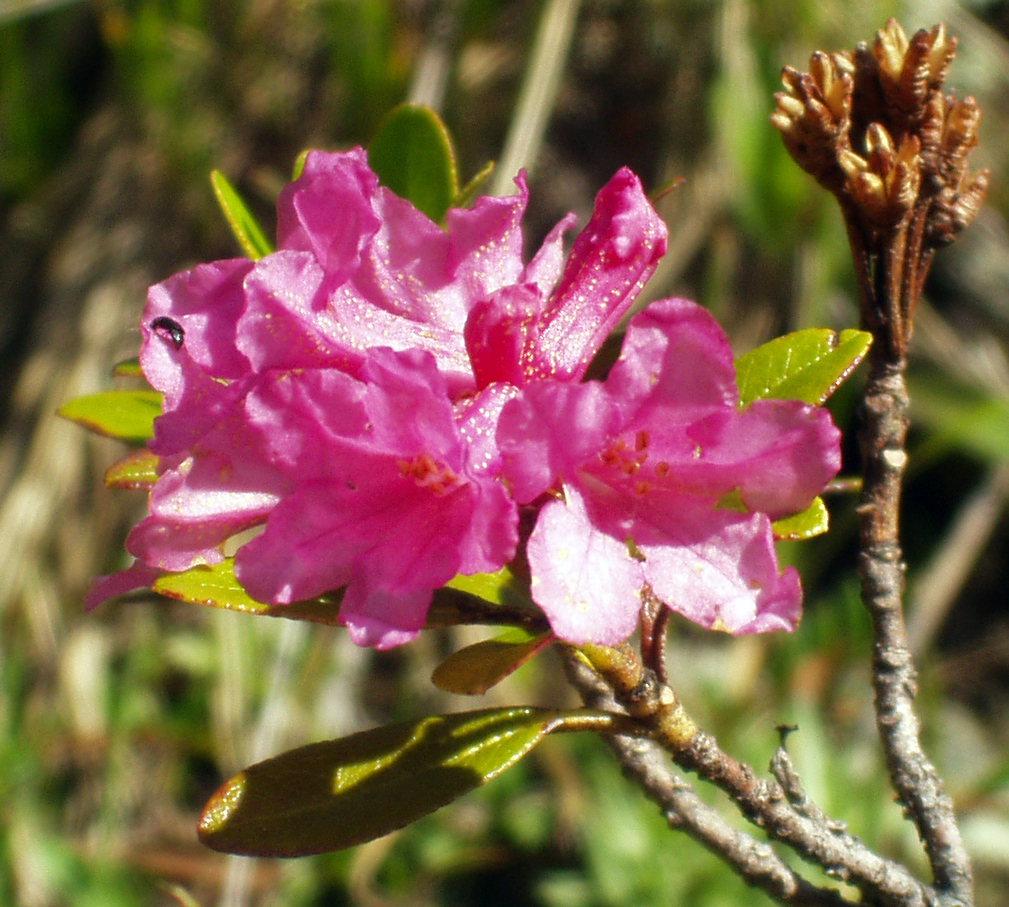
Rhododendron ferrugineum

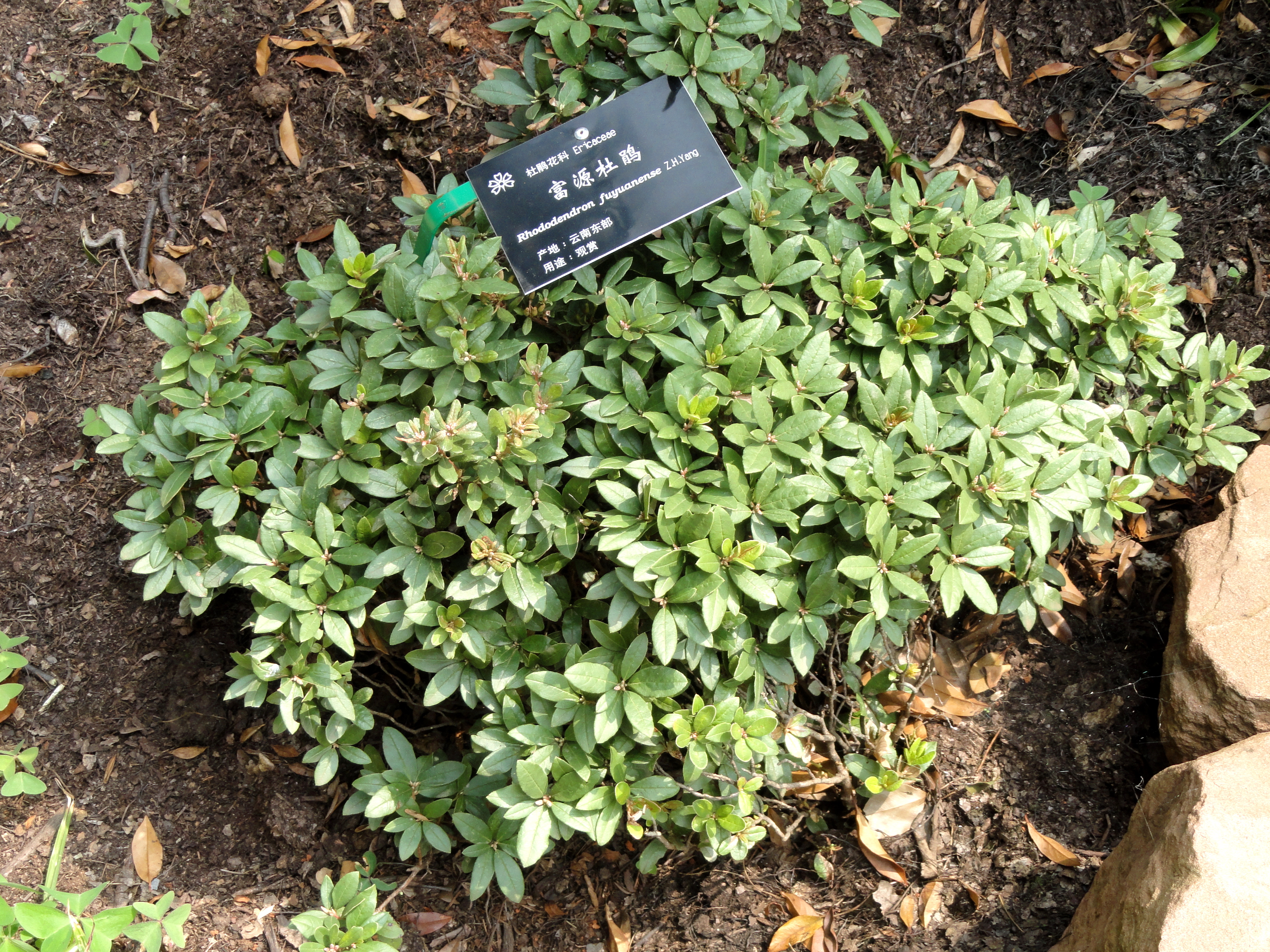
Rhododendron fuyuanense

- Rhododendron faberi Hemsl.
- Rhododendron facetum Balf.f. & Kingdon-Ward
- Rhododendron faithiae Chun
- Rhododendron falconeri Hook.f.
- Rhododendron fallacinum Sleumer
- Rhododendron fangchengense P.C.Tam
- Rhododendron farinosum H.Lév.
- Rhododendron farrerae Sweet
- Rhododendron fastigiatum Franch.
- Rhododendron faucium D.F.Chamb.
- Rhododendron feddei H.Lév.
- Rhododendron ferrugineum L.
- Rhododendron fictolacteum Balf.f.
- Rhododendron × filidactylis R.I.Milne
- Rhododendron × fittianum Balf.f.
- Rhododendron flammeum (Michx.) Sarg.
- Rhododendron flavantherum Hutch. & Kingdon-Ward
- Rhododendron flavidum Franch.
- Rhododendron flavoflorum T.L.Ming
- Rhododendron flavoviride J.J.Sm.
- Rhododendron fletcherianum Davidian
- Rhododendron fleuryi Dop ex A.Chev.
- Rhododendron floccigerum Franch.
- Rhododendron floribundum Franch.
- Rhododendron flosculum W.P.Fang & G.Z.Li
- Rhododendron flumineum W.P.Fang & M.Y.He
- Rhododendron formosanum Hemsl.
- Rhododendron formosum Wall.
- Rhododendron forrestii Balf.f. ex Diels
- Rhododendron fortunans J.J.Sm.
- Rhododendron fortunei Lindl.
- Rhododendron fragariiflorum Kingdon-Ward
- Rhododendron frey-wysslingii J.J.Sm.
- Rhododendron × fuchsii Sleumer
- Rhododendron fuchsiifolium H.Lév.
- Rhododendron fulgens Hook.f.
- Rhododendron fulvum Balf.f. & W.W.Sm.
- Rhododendron fuscipilum M.Y.He
- Rhododendron fuyuanense Z.H.Yang

== G ==
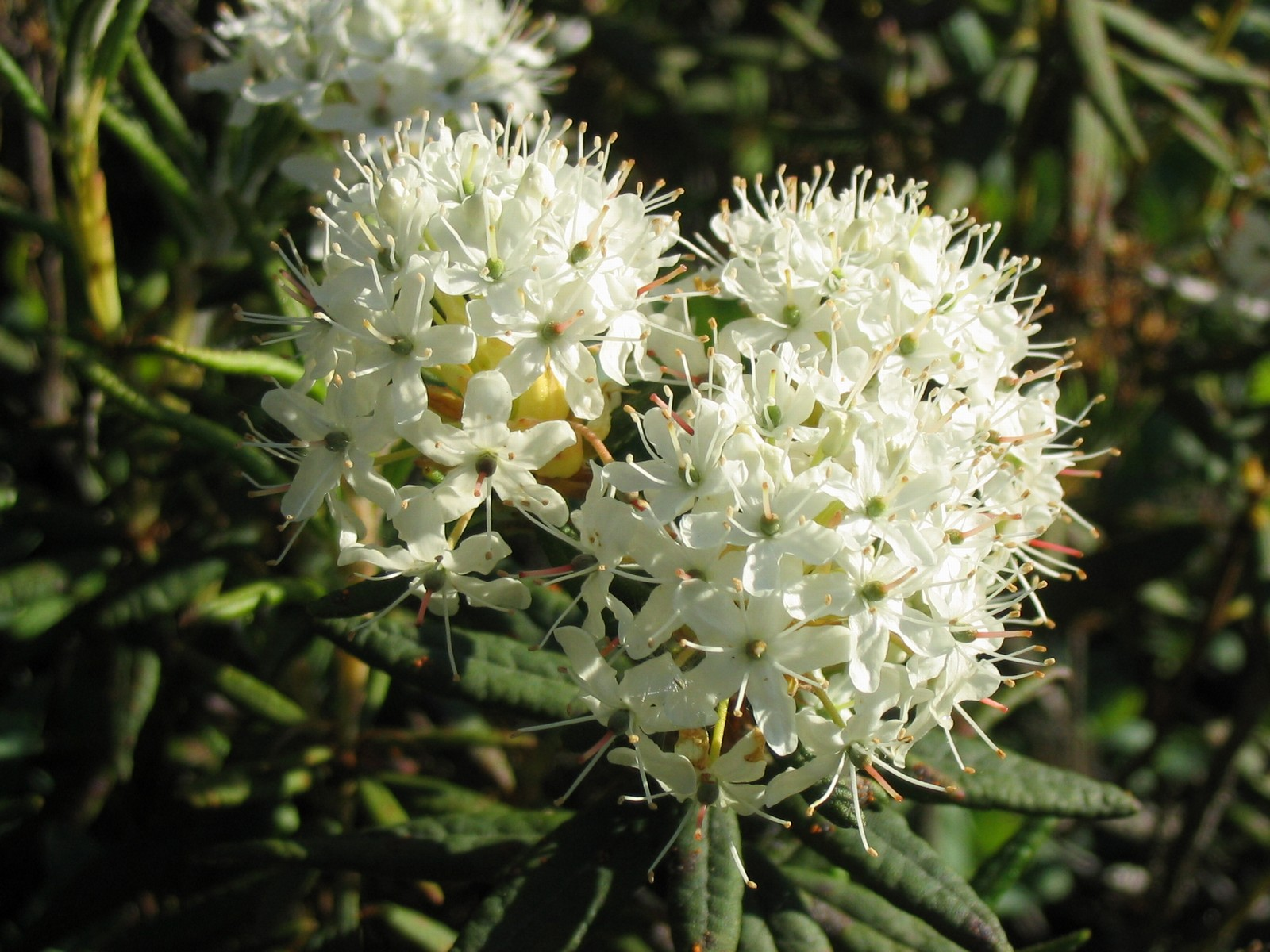
Rhododendron groenlandicum

- Rhododendron galactinum Balf.f. ex Tagg
- Rhododendron gannanense Z.C.Feng & X.G.Sun
- Rhododendron gardenia Schltr.
- Rhododendron gaultheriifolium J.J.Sm.
- Rhododendron genestierianum Forrest
- Rhododendron × geraldii (Hutch.) Ivens
- Rhododendron gideonii Argent
- Rhododendron × gilliardii Sleumer
- Rhododendron giulianettii Lauterb.
- Rhododendron glabrifilum J.J.Sm.
- Rhododendron glabriflorum J.J.Sm.
- Rhododendron × gladwynense M.G.Henry
- Rhododendron glanduliferum Franch.
- Rhododendron glandulosum (Standl. ex Small) Millais
- Rhododendron glaucophyllum Rehder
- Rhododendron glischroides Tagg & Forrest
- Rhododendron glischrum Balf.f. & W.W.Sm.
- Rhododendron gologense C.J.Xu & Z.J.Zhao
- Rhododendron gonggashanense W.K.Hu
- Rhododendron gongshanense T.L.Ming
- Rhododendron goodenoughii Sleumer
- Rhododendron goyozanense (M.Kikuchi) Craven
- Rhododendron gracilentum F.Muell.
- Rhododendron grande Wight
- Rhododendron griersonianum Balf.f. & Forrest
- Rhododendron griffithianum Wight
- Rhododendron groenlandicum (Oeder) Kron & Judd
- Rhododendron guangnanense R.C.Fang
- Rhododendron guihainianum G.Z.Li
- Rhododendron guizhongense G.Z.Li
- Rhododendron guizhouense M.Y.Fang
- Rhododendron gumineense Craven

== H ==
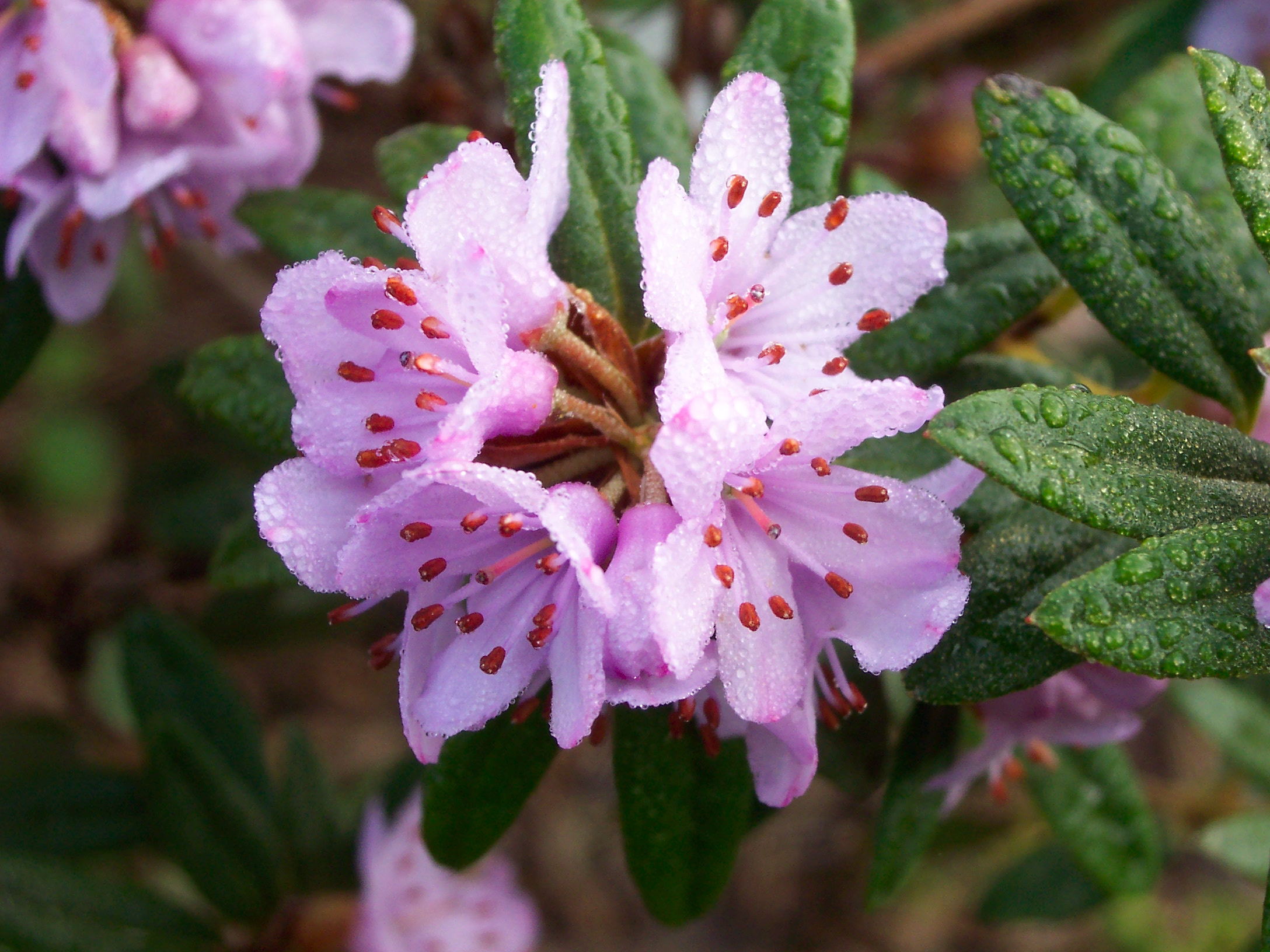
Rhododendron hippophaeoides

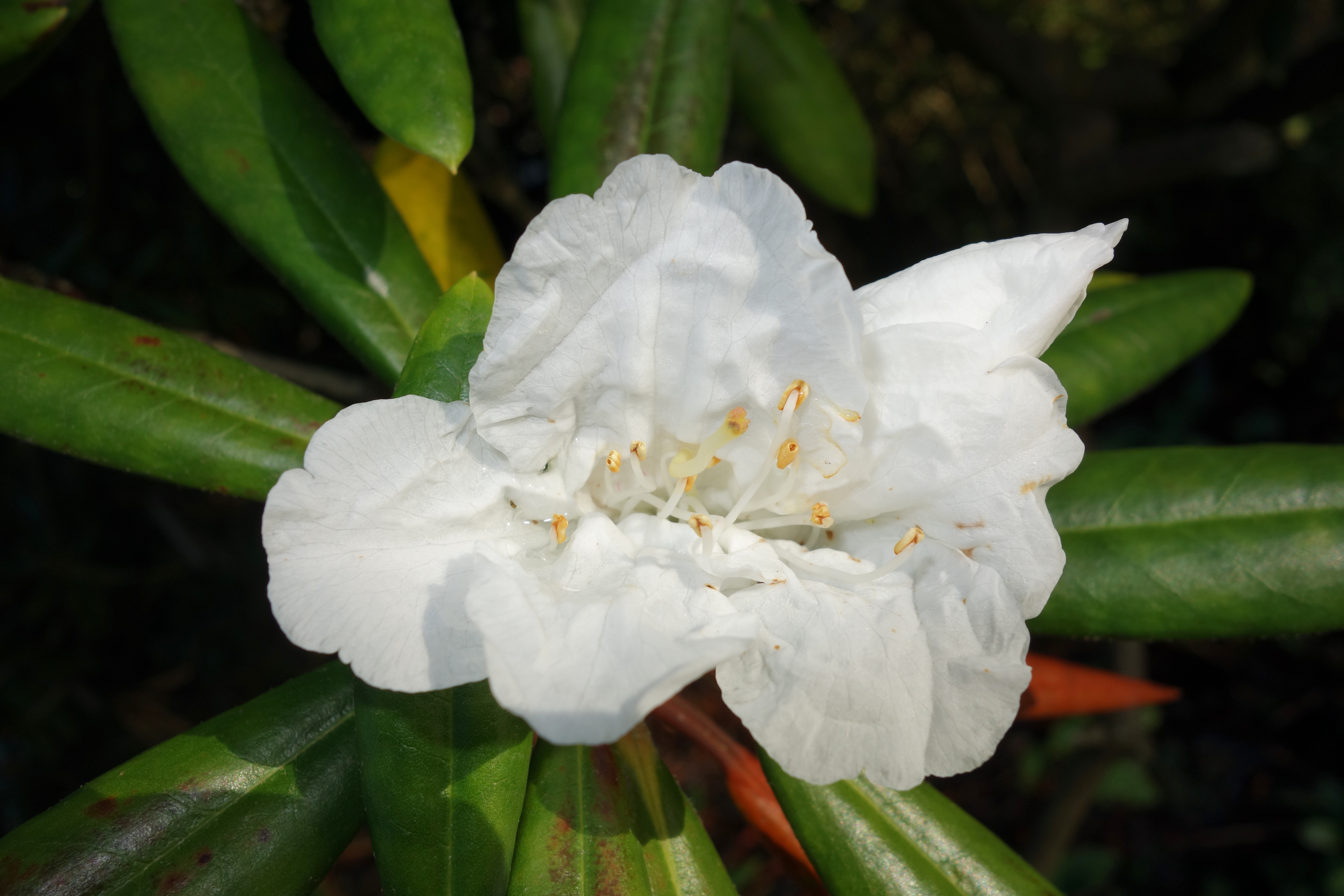
Rhododendron hyperythrum

- Rhododendron habbemae Koord.
- Rhododendron habrotrichum Balf.f. & W.W.Sm.
- Rhododendron haematodes Franch.
- Rhododendron haematophthalmum Sleumer
- Rhododendron hainanense Merr.
- Rhododendron hameliiflorum Wernham
- Rhododendron hanceanum Hemsl.
- Rhododendron hancockii Hemsl.
- Rhododendron hangzhouense W.P.Fang & M.Y.He
- Rhododendron haofui Chun & W.P.Fang
- Rhododendron hartleyi Sleumer
- Rhododendron × hasegawae S.Watan.
- Rhododendron hatamense Becc.
- Rhododendron heatherae Rushforth
- Rhododendron heizhugouense M.Y.He & L.C.Hu
- Rhododendron heliolepis Franch.
- Rhododendron hellwigii Warb.
- Rhododendron helodes Sleumer
- Rhododendron × hemigymnum (Tagg & Forrest) D.F.Chamb.
- Rhododendron hemitrichotum Balf.f. & Forrest
- Rhododendron hemsleyanum E.H.Wilson
- Rhododendron henanense W.P.Fang
- Rhododendron henryi Hance
- Rhododendron herzogii Warb.
- Rhododendron heteroclitum H.P.Yang
- Rhododendron heterolepis Danet
- Rhododendron × hidaense Makino ex H.Hara
- Rhododendron hidakanum H.Hara
- Rhododendron himantodes Sleumer
- Rhododendron hippophaeoides Balf.f. & W.W.Sm.
- Rhododendron hirsutipetiolatum R.C.Fang & A.L.Zhang
- Rhododendron hirsutum L.
- Rhododendron hirtipes Tagg
- Rhododendron hirtolepidotum J.J.Sm.
- Rhododendron hodgsonii Hook.f.
- Rhododendron hoi W.P.Fang
- Rhododendron hongkongense Hutch.
- Rhododendron hooglandii Sleumer
- Rhododendron hookeri Nutt.
- Rhododendron horlickianum Davidian
- Rhododendron huadingense B.Y.Ding & Y.Y.Fang
- Rhododendron huangpingense Xiang Chen & Jia Y.Huang
- Rhododendron huanshanense S.S.Ying
- Rhododendron huanum W.P.Fang
- Rhododendron huguangense P.C.Tam
- Rhododendron huidongense T.L.Ming
- Rhododendron hunanense Chun ex P.C.Tam
- Rhododendron hunnewellianum Rehder & E.H.Wilson
- Rhododendron × hunsteinii Argent
- Rhododendron hyacinthosmum Sleumer
- Rhododendron hylaeum Balf.f. & Farrer
- Rhododendron hyperythrum Hayata
- Rhododendron hypoglaucum Hemsl.
- Rhododendron hypoleucophyllum Makino
- Rhododendron hypoleucum (Kom.) Harmaja
- Rhododendron hyugaense (T.Yamaz.) T.Yamaz.

== I ==
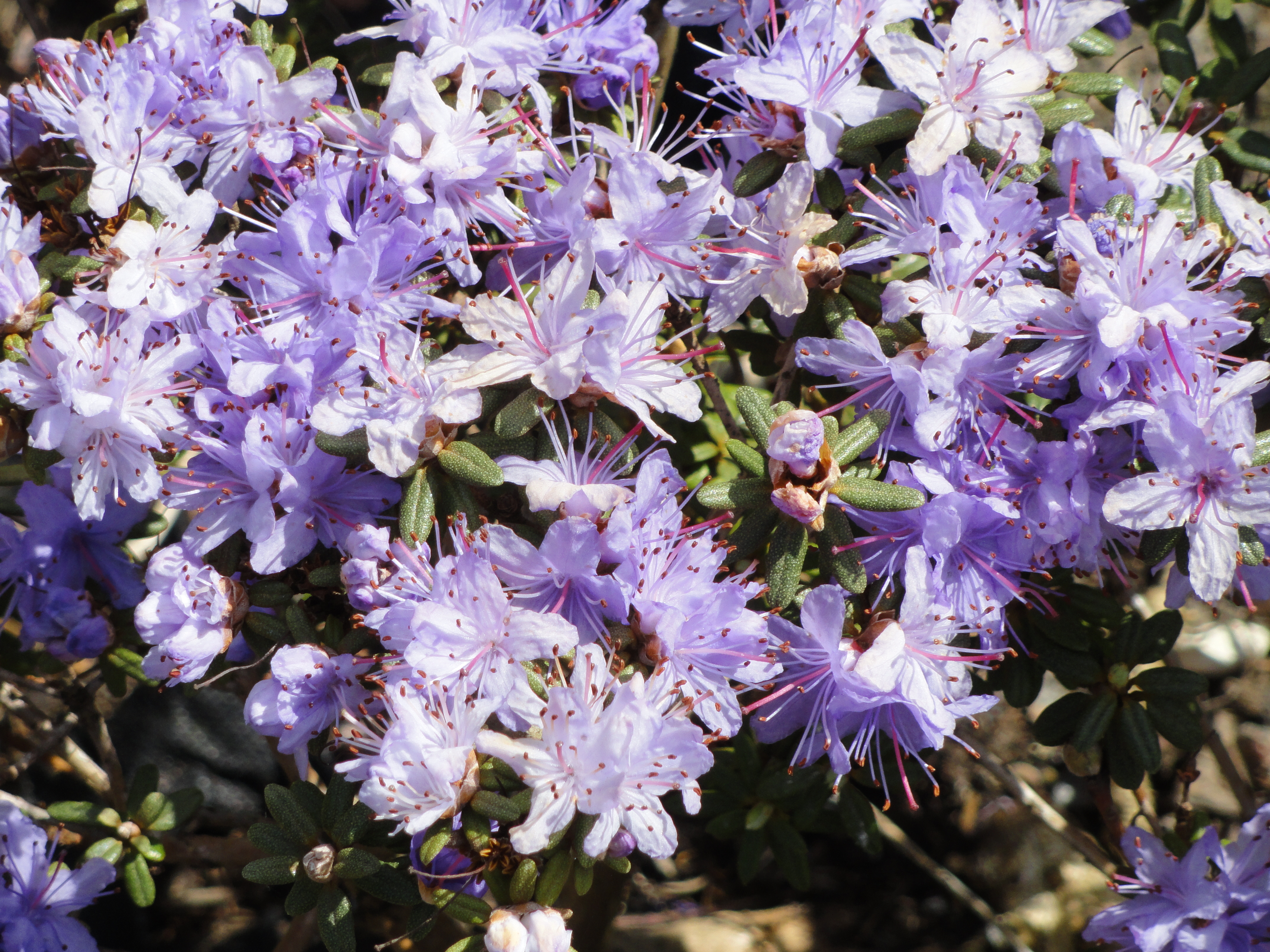
Rhododendron impeditum

- Rhododendron igneum Cowan
- Rhododendron impeditum Balf.f. & W.W.Sm.
- Rhododendron impositum J.J.Sm.
- Rhododendron impressopunctatum J.J.Sm.
- Rhododendron inaequale (C.B.Clarke) Hutch.
- Rhododendron incommodum Sleumer
- Rhododendron inconspicuum J.J.Sm.
- Rhododendron indicum (L.) Sweet
- Rhododendron × inopinum Balf.f. ex Tagg
- Rhododendron insculptum Kingdon-Ward
- Rhododendron insigne Hemsl. & E.H.Wilson
- Rhododendron × intermedium Tausch
- Rhododendron intranervatum Sleumer
- Rhododendron intricatum Franch.
- Rhododendron invictum Balf.f. & Farrer
- Rhododendron irroratum Franch.

== J ==
- Rhododendron japonicum (A.Gray) Suringar
- Rhododendron japonoheptamerum Kitam.
- Rhododendron jasminiflorum Hook.
- Rhododendron jasminoides M.Y.He
- Rhododendron javanicum (Blume) Benn.
- Rhododendron jiewhoei Argent
- Rhododendron jinboense Xiang Chen & X.Chen
- Rhododendron jinchangense Z.H.Yang
- Rhododendron jingangshanicum P.C.Tam
- Rhododendron jinpingense W.P.Fang & M.Y.He
- Rhododendron jinxiuense W.P.Fang & M.Y.He
- Rhododendron jiulongshanense Xiang Chen & Jia Y.Huang
- Rhododendron johnstoneanum (Brandis) Watt ex Hutch.
- Rhododendron joniense Ching & H.P.Yang

== K ==
- Rhododendron kaempferi Planch.
- Rhododendron × kamatae (Mochizuki) Craven
- Rhododendron kanehirae E.H.Wilson
- Rhododendron kansuense Millais
- Rhododendron kasoense Hutch. & Kingdon-Ward
- Rhododendron katsumatae (M.Tash. & H.Hatta) Craven
- Rhododendron kawakamii Hayata
- Rhododendron × kawir Danet
- Rhododendron × keditii Sleumer
- Rhododendron keiskei Miq.
- Rhododendron keleticum Balf.f. & Forrest
- Rhododendron kemulense J.J.Sm.
- Rhododendron kendrickii Nutt.
- Rhododendron kerowagiense Argent
- Rhododendron kesangiae D.G.Long & Rushforth
- Rhododendron keysii Nutt.
- Rhododendron kiangsiense W.P.Fang
- Rhododendron kingianum Watt
- Rhododendron × kisoanum Okuhara ex T.Shimizu
- Rhododendron kiusianum Makino
- Rhododendron kiyosumense (Makino) Makino
- Rhododendron klossii Ridl.
- Rhododendron kochii Stein
- Rhododendron kogo Danet
- Rhododendron × komatsui T.Yamaz.
- Rhododendron komiyamae Makino
- Rhododendron kongboense Kingdon-Ward ex Hutch.
- Rhododendron konori Becc.
- Rhododendron korthalsii Miq.
- Rhododendron kotschyi Simonk.
- Rhododendron × koudzumontanum Hid.Takah. & Katsuy.
- Rhododendron kroniae Craven
- Rhododendron kuomeianum Yu H.Chang, J.Nielsen & Y.P.Ma
- Rhododendron × kuratanum S.Watan.
- Rhododendron × kurohimense Arakawa
- Rhododendron kwangsiense Hu ex P.C.Tam
- Rhododendron kwangtungense Merr. & Chun
- Rhododendron kyawii Lace & W.W.Sm.
- Rhododendron kyushuense Minamit.

== L ==
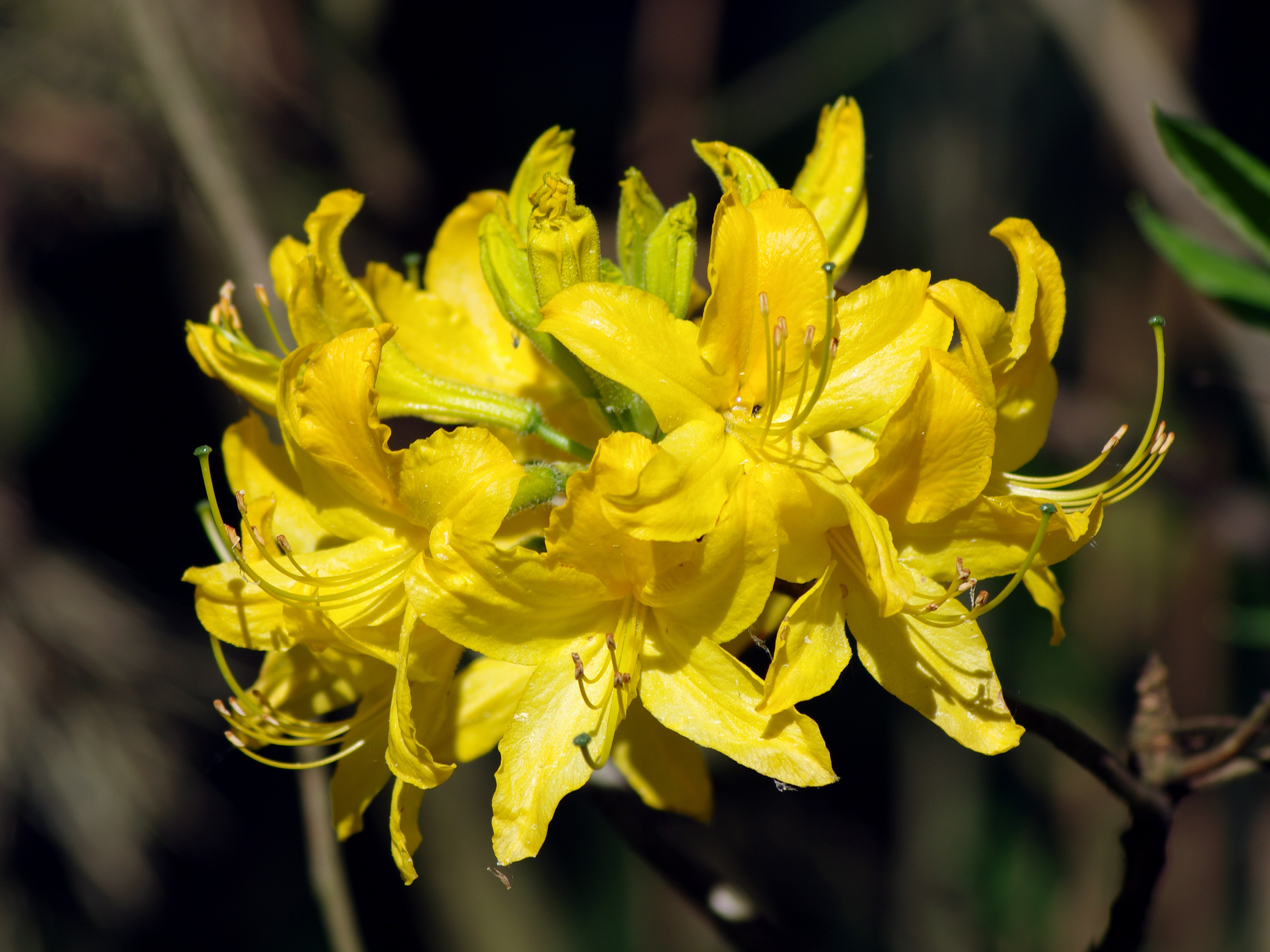
Rhododendron luteum

- Rhododendron labolengense Ching & H.P.Yang
- Rhododendron lacteum Franch.
- Rhododendron laetum J.J.Sm.
- Rhododendron lagopus Nakai
- Rhododendron lagunculicarpum J.J.Sm.
- Rhododendron lambianum Argent
- Rhododendron lamii J.J.Sm.
- Rhododendron lampongum Miq.
- Rhododendron lamrialianum Argent & T.J.Barkman
- Rhododendron lanatoides D.F.Chamb.
- Rhododendron lanatum Hook.f.
- Rhododendron lanceolatum Ridl.
- Rhododendron langbianense A.Chev. ex Dop
- Rhododendron lanigerum Tagg
- Rhododendron laojunense T.L.Ming
- Rhododendron laojunshanense M.Y.Fang
- Rhododendron lapponicum (L.) Wahlenb.
- Rhododendron lasiostylum Hayata
- Rhododendron lateriflorum R.C.Fang & A.L.Zhang
- Rhododendron latoucheae Franch.
- Rhododendron laudandum Cowan
- Rhododendron leigongshanense C.H.Yang, Z.G.Xie, Y.F.Yu & Z.R.Yang
- Rhododendron leishanicum W.P.Fang & X.S.Zhang
- Rhododendron lepidostylum Balf.f. & Forrest
- Rhododendron lepidotum Wall. ex G.Don
- Rhododendron leptanthum F.Muell.
- Rhododendron leptobrachion Sleumer
- Rhododendron leptocarpum Nutt.
- Rhododendron leptomorphum Sleumer
- Rhododendron leptopeplum Balf.f. & Forrest
- Rhododendron leptothrium Balf.f. & Forrest
- Rhododendron leucaspis Tagg
- Rhododendron leucogigas Sleumer
- Rhododendron levinei Merr.
- Rhododendron leytense Merr.
- Rhododendron liangshanicum Z.J.Zhao
- Rhododendron liaoxigense S.L.Tung & Z.Lu
- Rhododendron liboense Zheng R.Chen & K.M.Lan
- Rhododendron × liewianum Argent, A.Lamb & Phillipps
- Rhododendron lilacinum Xiang Chen & X.Chen
- Rhododendron liliiflorum H.Lév.
- Rhododendron lindaueanum Koord.
- Rhododendron lindleyi T.Moore
- Rhododendron lineare Merr.
- Rhododendron linearilobum R.C.Fang & A.L.Chang
- Rhododendron linguiense G.Z.Li
- Rhododendron litchiifolium T.C.Wu & P.C.Tam
- Rhododendron loboense H.F.Copel.
- Rhododendron lochiae F.Muell.
- Rhododendron × lochmium Balf.f.
- Rhododendron loerzingii J.J.Sm.
- Rhododendron lohitense D.Bhattach.
- Rhododendron lompohense J.J.Sm.
- Rhododendron longesquamatum C.K.Schneid.
- Rhododendron longicalyx M.Y.Fang
- Rhododendron longifalcatum P.C.Tam
- Rhododendron longiflorum Lindl.
- Rhododendron longilobum L.M.Gao & D.Z.Li
- Rhododendron longipedicellatum Lei Cai & Y.P.Ma
- Rhododendron longiperulatum Hayata
- Rhododendron longipes Rehder & E.H.Wilson
- Rhododendron longistylum Rehder & E.H.Wilson
- Rhododendron loniceriflorum P.C.Tam
- Rhododendron loranthiflorum Sleumer
- Rhododendron lowii Hook.f.
- Rhododendron lowndesii Davidian
- Rhododendron luciferum (Cowan) Cowan
- Rhododendron ludlowii Cowan
- Rhododendron luhuoense H.P.Yang
- Rhododendron lukiangense Franch.
- Rhododendron lulangense L.C.Hu & Tateishi
- Rhododendron lungchiense W.P.Fang
- Rhododendron luraluense Sleumer
- Rhododendron luteiflorum (Davidian) Cullen
- Rhododendron lutescens Franch.
- Rhododendron luteum Sweet

== M ==
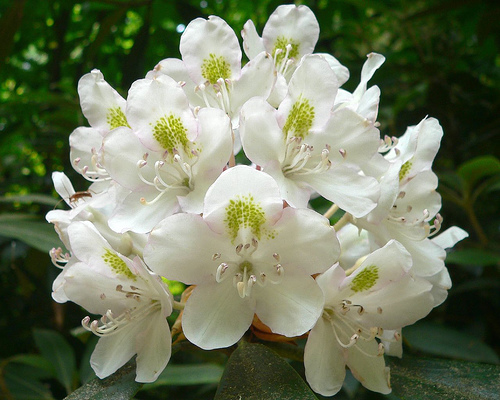
Rhododendron maximum

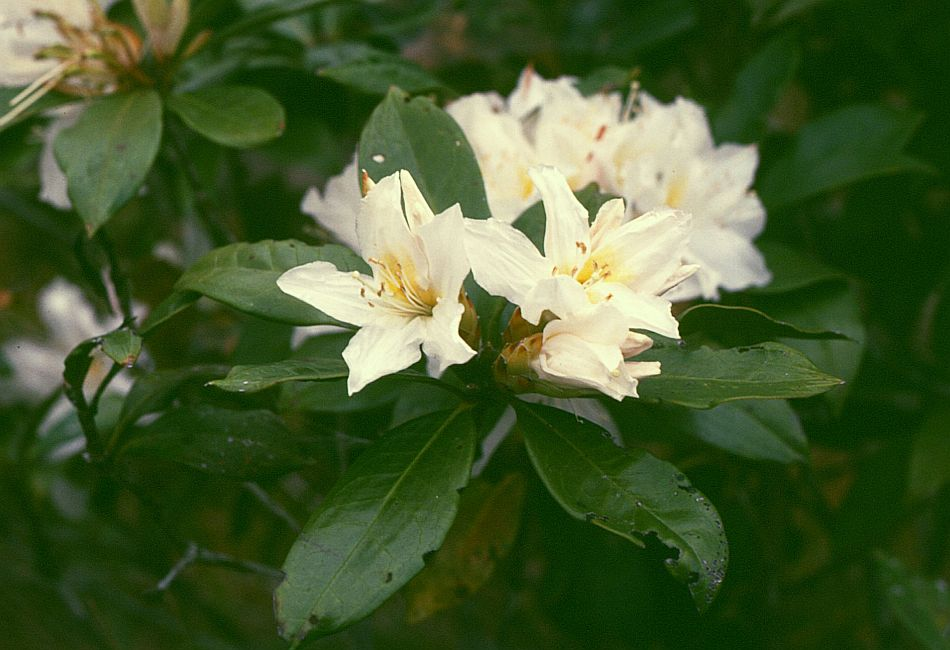
Rhododendron moulmainense

- Rhododendron macabeanum G.Watt ex Balf.f.
- Rhododendron macgregoriae F.Muell.
- Rhododendron mackenzianum Forrest
- Rhododendron macrophyllum D.Don ex G.Don
- Rhododendron macrosiphon Sleumer
- Rhododendron maculiferum Franch.
- Rhododendron maddenii Hook.f.
- Rhododendron madulidii Argent
- Rhododendron magnificum Kingdon-Ward
- Rhododendron magniflorum W.K.Hu
- Rhododendron mainlingense S.H.Huang & R.C.Fang
- Rhododendron majus (J.J.Sm.) Sleumer
- Rhododendron makinoi Tagg ex Nakai
- Rhododendron malayanum Jack
- Rhododendron malipoense M.Y.He
- Rhododendron mallotum Balf.f. & Kingdon-Ward
- Rhododendron maoerense W.P.Fang & G.Z.Li
- Rhododendron maowenense Ching & H.P.Yang
- Rhododendron mariae Hance
- Rhododendron mariesii Hemsl. & E.H.Wilson
- Rhododendron martinianum Balf.f. & Forrest
- Rhododendron maximum L.
- Rhododendron maxiongense C.Q.Zhang & D.Paterson
- Rhododendron maxwellii Gibbs
- Rhododendron mayebarae Nakai & H.Hara
- Rhododendron meagae Mambrasar & Hutabarat
- Rhododendron mechukae A.A.Mao & A.Paul
- Rhododendron meddianum Forrest
- Rhododendron medoense W.P.Fang & M.Y.He
- Rhododendron megacalyx Balf.f. & Kingdon-Ward
- Rhododendron megalanthum M.Y.Fang
- Rhododendron megeratum Balf.f. & Forrest
- Rhododendron meijeri Argent, A.Lamb & Phillipps
- Rhododendron mekongense Franch.
- Rhododendron melantherum Schltr.
- Rhododendron meliphagidum J.J.Sm.
- Rhododendron mendumiae Argent
- Rhododendron mengtszense Balf.f. & W.W.Sm.
- Rhododendron menziesii Craven
- Rhododendron meridionale P.C.Tam
- Rhododendron mianningense Z.J.Zhao
- Rhododendron micranthum Turcz.
- Rhododendron microcarpum R.L.Liu & L.M.Gao
- Rhododendron microgynum Balf.f. & Forrest
- Rhododendron micromalayanum Sleumer
- Rhododendron microphyton Franch.
- Rhododendron milleri Argent
- Rhododendron mimetes Tagg & Forrest
- Rhododendron mindanaense Merr.
- Rhododendron mingii Y.P.Ma, L.M.Gao & E.D.Liu
- Rhododendron miniatum Cowan
- Rhododendron minimifolium Wernham
- Rhododendron minus Michx.
- Rhododendron minutiflorum Hu
- Rhododendron minyaense M.N.Philipson & Philipson
- Rhododendron mitriforme P.C.Tam
- Rhododendron miyiense W.K.Hu
- Rhododendron × mizumotoi S.Watan.
- Rhododendron mogeanum Argent
- Rhododendron molle (Blume) G.Don
- Rhododendron mollianum Koord.
- Rhododendron mollicomum Balf.f. & W.W.Sm.
- Rhododendron monanthum Balf.f. & W.W.Sm.
- Rhododendron monkoboense Argent
- Rhododendron monodii (H.J.Lam) Argent
- Rhododendron montiganum T.L.Ming
- Rhododendron montroseanum Davidian
- Rhododendron morii Hayata
- Rhododendron moulmainense Hook.
- Rhododendron moupinense Franch.
- Rhododendron mucronatum (Blume) G.Don
- Rhododendron mucronulatum Turcz.
- Rhododendron multicolor Miq.
- Rhododendron multiflorum (Maxim.) Craven
- Rhododendron multinervium Sleumer
- Rhododendron muscicola J.J.Sm.
- Rhododendron muscipulum Danet
- Rhododendron myrsinifolium Ching ex W.P.Fang & M.Y.He
- Rhododendron myrsinites Sleumer

== N ==
- Rhododendron naamkwanense Merr.
- Rhododendron nakaharae Hayata
- Rhododendron nakotiltum Balf.f. & Forrest
- Rhododendron nanjianense K.M.Feng & Z.H.Yang
- Rhododendron nanophyton Sleumer
- Rhododendron nanpingense P.C.Tam
- Rhododendron nantouense S.S.Ying
- Rhododendron natalicium Sleumer
- Rhododendron nayarii G.D.Pal
- Rhododendron × nebulicola Danet
- Rhododendron neobritannicum Sleumer
- Rhododendron neriiflorum Franch.
- Rhododendron neriifolium Schltr.
- Rhododendron nervulosum Sleumer
- Rhododendron ngawchangense M.N.Philipson & Philipson
- Rhododendron nhatrangense Dop
- Rhododendron nieuwenhuisii J.J.Sm.
- Rhododendron nigroglandulosum Nitz.
- Rhododendron × niko-montanum (Komatsu) Nakai
- Rhododendron nipponicum Matsum.
- Rhododendron nitidulum Rehder & E.H.Wilson
- Rhododendron nivale Hook.f.
- Rhododendron niveoflorum Argent
- Rhododendron niveum Hook.f.
- Rhododendron noriakianum T.Suzuki
- Rhododendron nortoniae Merr.
- Rhododendron nubicola Wernham
- Rhododendron nudipes Nakai
- Rhododendron nummatum J.J.Sm.
- Rhododendron nuttallii T.J.Booth ex Nutt.
- Rhododendron nyingchiense R.C.Fang & S.H.Huang
- Rhododendron nymphaeoides W.K.Hu

== O ==
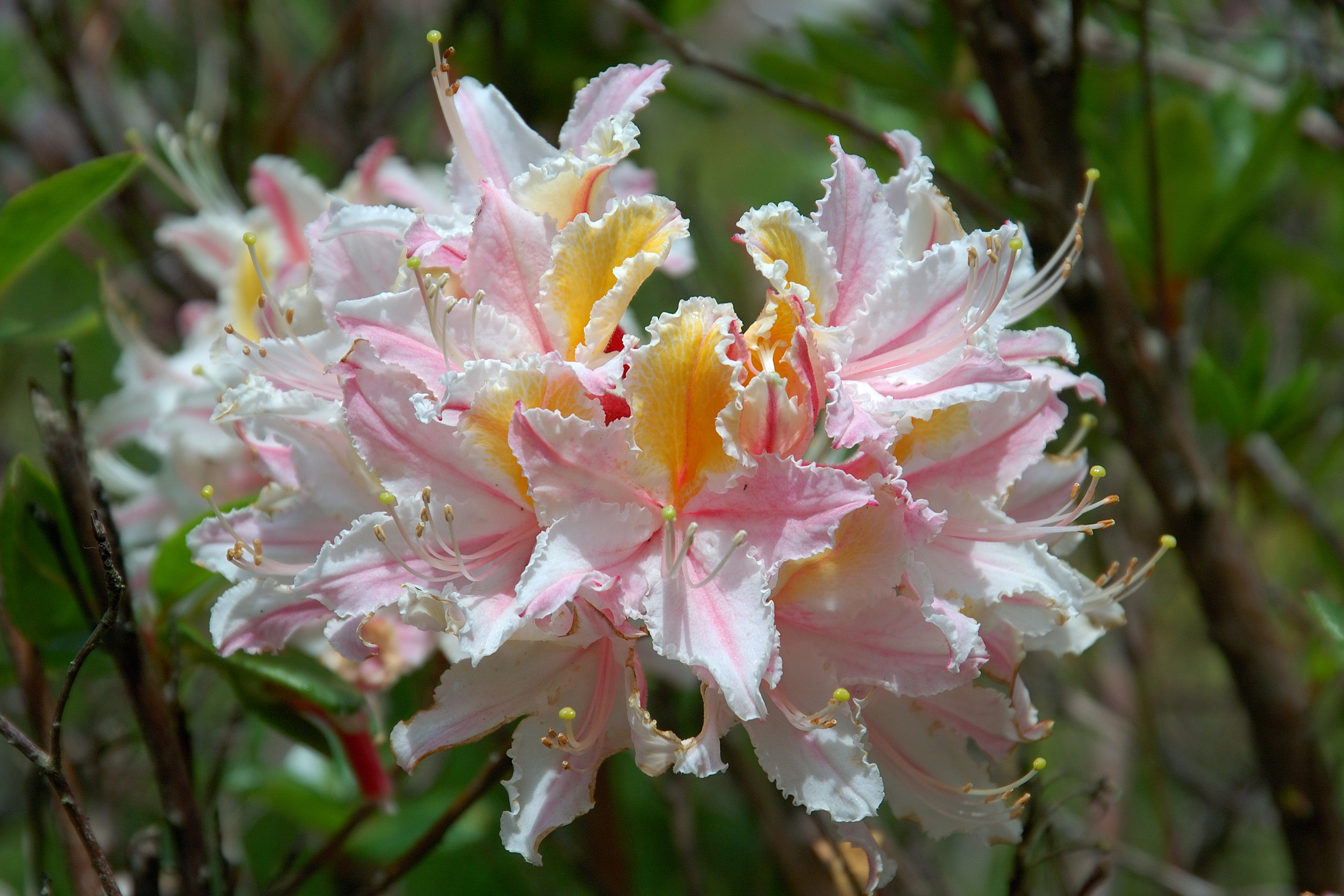
Rhododendron occidentale

- Rhododendron oblancifolium M.Y.Fang
- Rhododendron occidentale (Torr. & A.Gray) A.Gray
- Rhododendron ochraceum Rehder & E.H.Wilson
- Rhododendron octandrum M.Y.He
- Rhododendron oldhamii Maxim.
- Rhododendron oliganthum Sleumer
- Rhododendron oligocarpum W.P.Fang & X.S.Zhang
- Rhododendron × ootrichum (Sleumer) Argent
- Rhododendron opulentum Sleumer
- Rhododendron orbiculare Decne.
- Rhododendron orbiculatum Ridl.
- Rhododendron oreadum Wernham
- Rhododendron oreites Sleumer
- Rhododendron oreodoxa Franch.
- Rhododendron oreogenum L.C.Hu
- Rhododendron oreotrephes W.W.Sm.
- Rhododendron orthocladum Balf.f. & Forrest
- Rhododendron osuzuyamense T.Yamaz.
- Rhododendron ovatum (Lindl.) Planch. ex Maxim.
- Rhododendron oxycoccoides Sleumer

== P ==
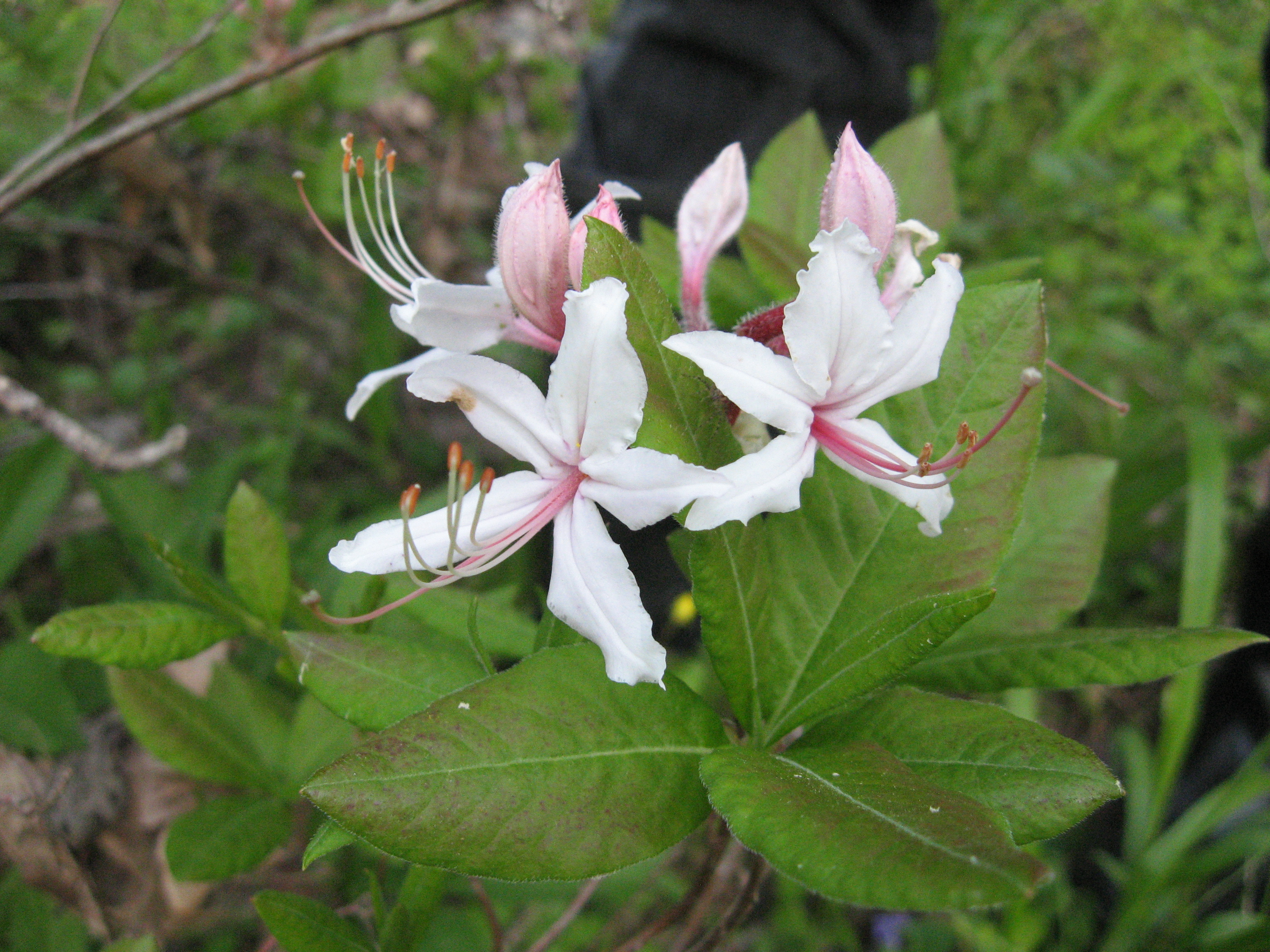
Rhododendron periclymenoides

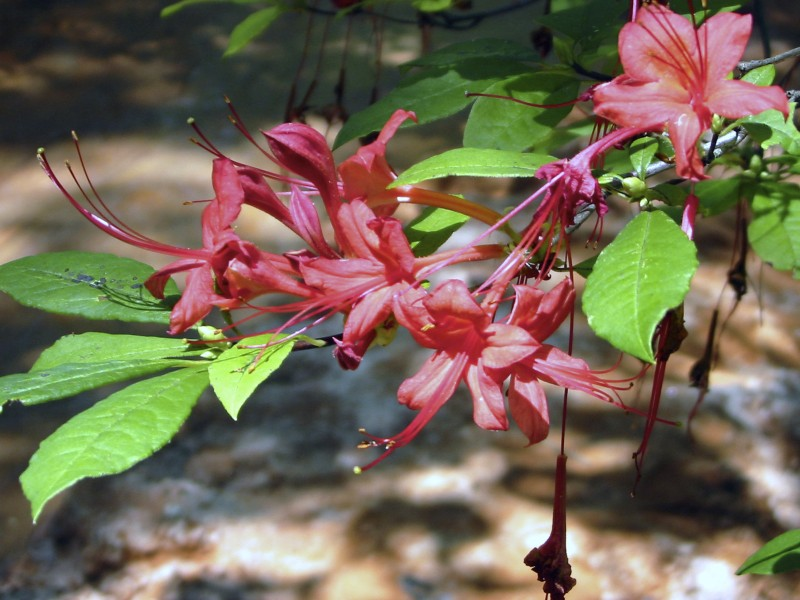
Rhododendron prunifolium

- Rhododendron pachycarpon Sleumer
- Rhododendron pachyphyllum W.P.Fang
- Rhododendron pachypodum Balf.f. & W.W.Sm.
- Rhododendron pachysanthum Hayata
- Rhododendron pachystigma Sleumer
- Rhododendron pachytrichum Franch.
- Rhododendron × pallescens Hutch.
- Rhododendron papillatum Balf.f. & R.E.Cooper
- Rhododendron papuanum Becc.
- Rhododendron × paradoxum Balf.f. ex Tagg
- Rhododendron parishii C.B.Clarke
- Rhododendron parmulatum Cowan
- Rhododendron parryae Hutch.
- Rhododendron parvifolium Adams
- Rhododendron parvulum Sleumer
- Rhododendron pauciflorum King & Gamble
- Rhododendron pemakoense Kingdon-Ward
- Rhododendron pendulum Hook.f.
- Rhododendron pennivenium Balf.f. & Forrest
- Rhododendron × pennsylvanicum (B.E.Harkn.) Rehder
- Rhododendron pentandrum (Maxim.) Craven
- Rhododendron pentaphyllum Maxim.
- Rhododendron perakense King & Gamble
- Rhododendron × peregrinum Tagg
- Rhododendron periclymenoides (Michx.) Shinners
- Rhododendron perplexum Sleumer
- Rhododendron petrocharis Diels
- Rhododendron phaeochiton F.Muell.
- Rhododendron phaeochristum Sleumer
- Rhododendron phaeochrysum Balf.f. & W.W.Sm.
- Rhododendron phaeops Sleumer
- Rhododendron piercei Davidian
- Rhododendron pilostylum W.K.Hu
- Rhododendron pilosum (Michx. ex Lam.) Craven
- Rhododendron pinetorum P.C.Tam
- Rhododendron pingbianense M.Y.Fang
- Rhododendron pingianum W.P.Fang
- Rhododendron × planecostatum Sleumer
- Rhododendron × planetum Balf.f.
- Rhododendron platyphyllum (Franch. ex Diels) Balf.f. & W.W.Sm.
- Rhododendron platypodum Diels
- Rhododendron pleianthum Sleumer
- Rhododendron pleistanthum E.H.Wilson
- Rhododendron pocophorum Balf.f. ex Tagg
- Rhododendron pogonophyllum Cowan & Davidian
- Rhododendron poilanei Dop
- Rhododendron poluninii Davidian
- Rhododendron polyanthemum Sleumer
- Rhododendron polycladum Franch.
- Rhododendron polylepis Franch.
- Rhododendron polytrichum W.P.Fang
- Rhododendron pomense Cowan & Davidian
- Rhododendron ponticum L.
- Rhododendron populare Cowan
- Rhododendron poremense J.J.Sm.
- Rhododendron porphyranthes Sleumer
- Rhododendron potaninii Batalin
- Rhododendron praestans Balf.f. & W.W.Sm.
- Rhododendron praeteritum Hutch.
- Rhododendron praetervisum Sleumer
- Rhododendron praevernum Hutch.
- Rhododendron prainianum Koord.
- Rhododendron prattii Franch.
- Rhododendron preptum Balf.f. & Forrest
- Rhododendron primuliflorum Bureau & Franch.
- Rhododendron principis Bureau & Franch.
- Rhododendron prinophyllum (Small) Millais
- Rhododendron proliferum Sleumer
- Rhododendron pronum Tagg & Forrest
- Rhododendron protandrum Sleumer
- Rhododendron proteoides Balf.f. & W.W.Sm.
- Rhododendron protistum Balf.f. & Forrest
- Rhododendron pruniflorum Hutch. & Kingdon-Ward
- Rhododendron prunifolium (Small) Millais
- Rhododendron przewalskii Maxim.
- Rhododendron × psammogenes Sleumer
- Rhododendron pseudobuxifolium Sleumer
- Rhododendron pseudochrysanthum Hayata
- Rhododendron pseudociliipes Cullen
- Rhododendron pseudomaddenii A.A.Mao & Bhaumik
- Rhododendron pseudotrichanthum Sleumer
- Rhododendron psilanthum Sleumer
- Rhododendron pubescens Balf.f. & Forrest
- Rhododendron pubicostatum T.L.Ming
- Rhododendron pubigermen J.J.Sm.
- Rhododendron pudiense Xiang Chen & Jia Y.Huang
- Rhododendron pudingense X.Y.Dai, C.H.Yang & Y.P.Ma
- Rhododendron pudorinum Sleumer
- Rhododendron pudorosum Cowan
- Rhododendron pugeense L.C.Hu
- Rhododendron pulchroides Chun & W.P.Fang
- Rhododendron × pulchrum Sweet
- Rhododendron pulleanum Koord.
- Rhododendron pumilum Hook.f.
- Rhododendron punctifolium L.C.Hu
- Rhododendron purdomii Rehder & E.H.Wilson
- Rhododendron purpureiflorum J.J.Sm.
- Rhododendron pusillum J.J.Sm.
- Rhododendron × pyrrhoanthum Balf.f.
- Rhododendron pyrrhophorum Sleumer

== Q ==
- Rhododendron qianyangense M.Y.He
- Rhododendron qiaojiaense L.M.Gao & D.Z.Li
- Rhododendron qinghaiense Ching ex W.Y.Wang
- Rhododendron quadrasianum S.Vidal
- Rhododendron quinquefolium Bisset & S.Moore

== R ==
- Rhododendron racemosum Franch.
- Rhododendron radendum W.P.Fang
- Rhododendron radians J.J.Sm.
- Rhododendron ramipilosum T.L.Ming
- Rhododendron ramsdenianum Cowan
- Rhododendron rappardii Sleumer
- Rhododendron rarilepidotum J.J.Sm.
- Rhododendron rarum Schltr.
- Rhododendron rawatii I.D.Rai & B.S.Adhikari
- Rhododendron recurvoides Tagg & Kingdon-Ward
- Rhododendron redowskianum Maxim.
- Rhododendron renschianum Sleumer
- Rhododendron reticulatum D.Don ex G.Don
- Rhododendron retivenium Sleumer
- Rhododendron retrorsipilum Sleumer
- Rhododendron retusum (Blume) Benn.
- Rhododendron revolutum Sleumer
- Rhododendron rex H.Lév.
- Rhododendron reynosoi Argent
- Rhododendron rhodanthum M.Y.He
- Rhododendron rhodochroum Sleumer
- Rhododendron rhodoleucum Sleumer
- Rhododendron rhodosalpinx Sleumer
- Rhododendron rhodostomum Sleumer
- Rhododendron rhombifolium R.C.Fang
- Rhododendron rhuyuenense Chun ex P.C.Tam
- Rhododendron rigidum Franch.
- Rhododendron rimicola X.L.Tian, Y.P.Ma & J.Nielsen
- Rhododendron riparioides (Cullen) Cubey
- Rhododendron ripense Makino
- Rhododendron ripleyi Merr.
- Rhododendron ririei Hemsl. & E.H.Wilson
- Rhododendron rivulare Hand.-Mazz.
- Rhododendron robinsonii Ridl.
- Rhododendron roseatum Hutch.
- Rhododendron roseiflorum P.F.Stevens
- Rhododendron rosendahlii Sleumer
- Rhododendron rothschildii Davidian
- Rhododendron rousei Argent & Madulid
- Rhododendron roxieanum Forrest ex W.W.Sm.
- Rhododendron roxieoides D.F.Chamb.
- Rhododendron rubellum Sleumer
- Rhododendron rubiginosum Franch.
- Rhododendron rubineiflorum Craven
- Rhododendron rubrantherum Kingdon-Ward
- Rhododendron rubrobracteatum Sleumer
- Rhododendron rubropilosum Hayata
- Rhododendron rufescens Franch.
- Rhododendron rufohirtum Hand.-Mazz.
- Rhododendron rufum Batalin
- Rhododendron rugosum H.Low ex Hook.f.
- Rhododendron rupicola W.W.Sm.
- Rhododendron rupivalleculatum P.C.Tam
- Rhododendron rushforthii Argent & D.F.Chamb.
- Rhododendron russatum Balf.f. & Forrest
- Rhododendron ruttenii J.J.Sm.

== S ==
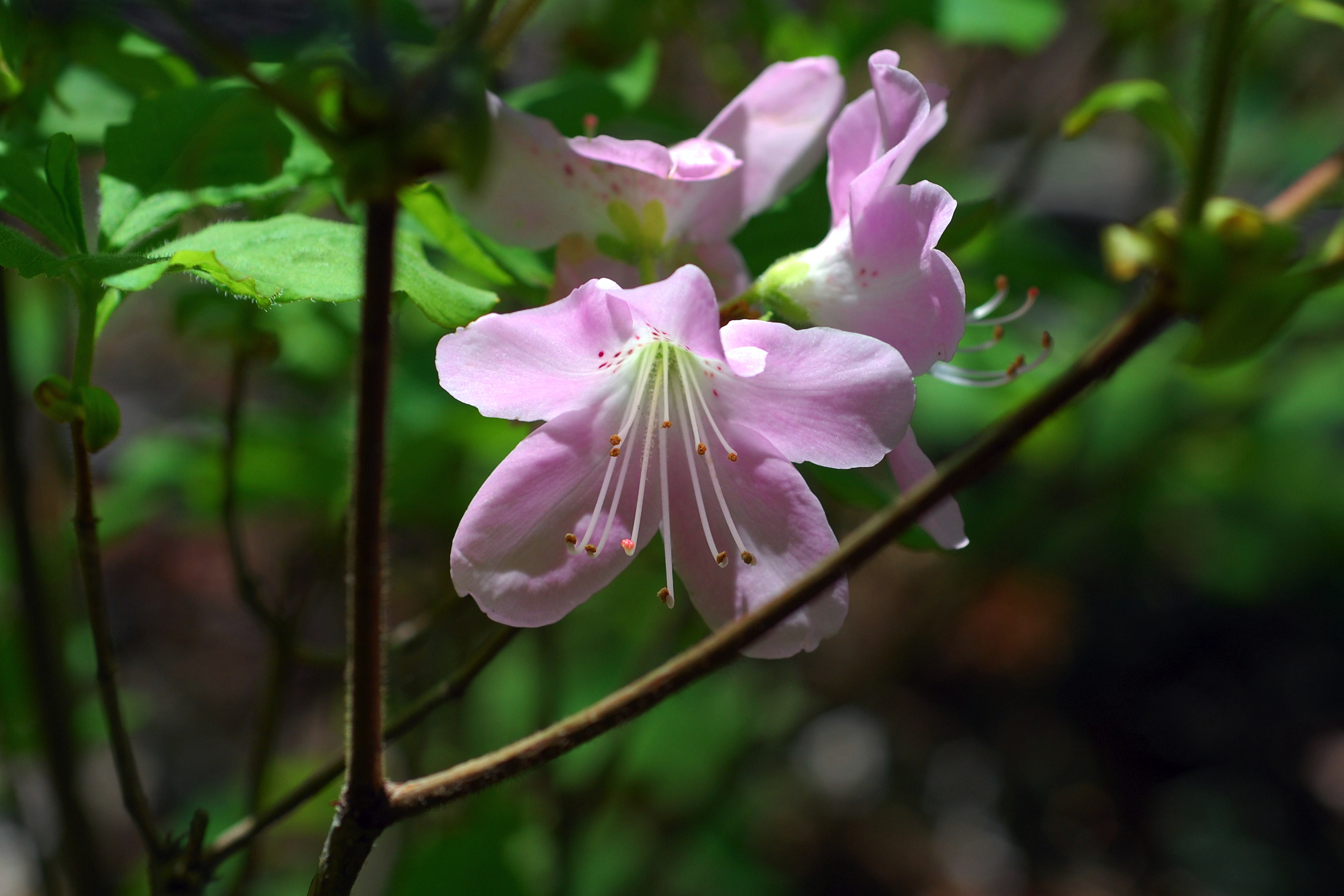
Rhododendron schlippenbachii

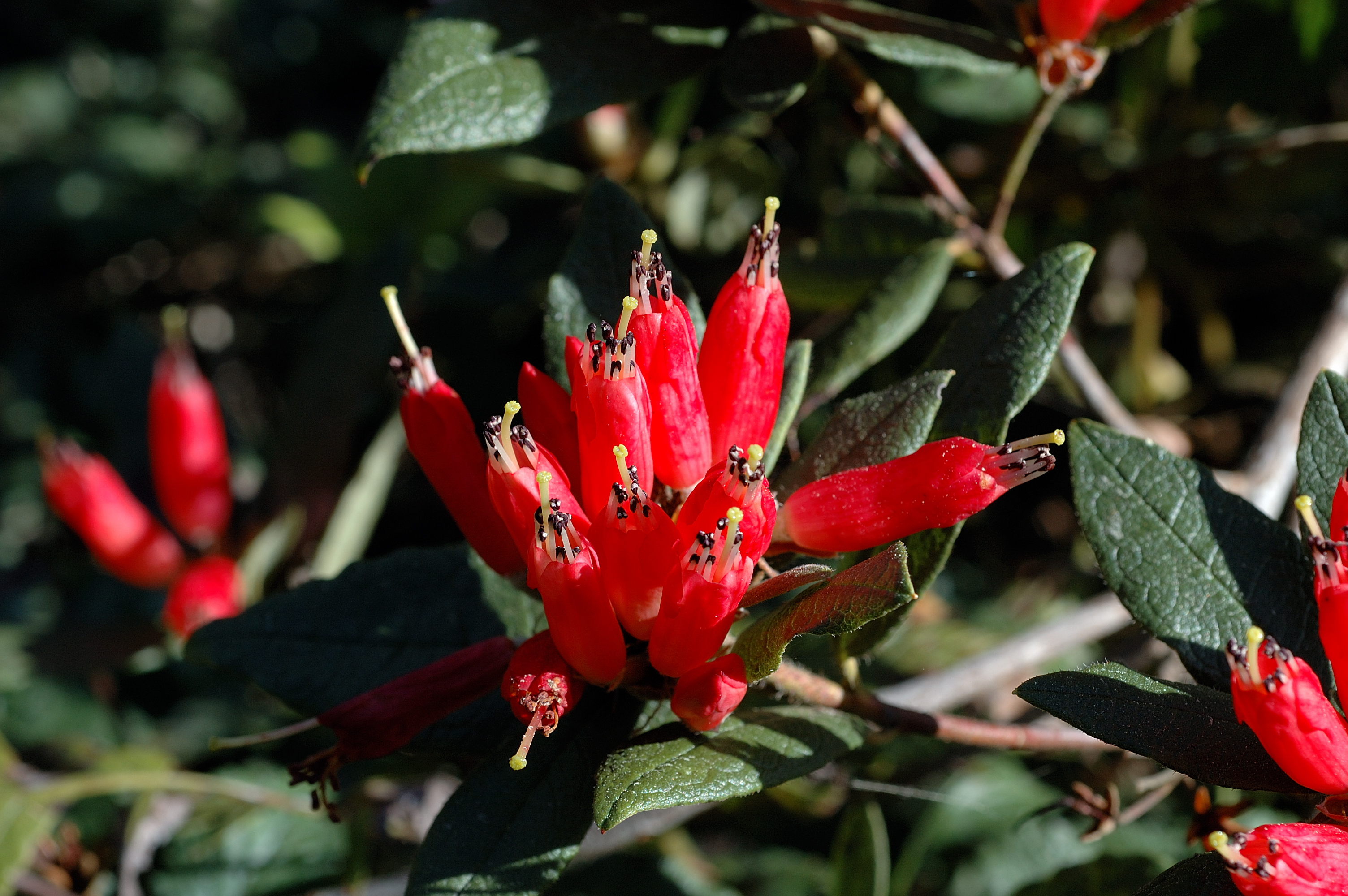
Rhododendron spinuliferum

- Rhododendron sajanense Stepanov
- Rhododendron salicifolium Becc.
- Rhododendron saluenense Franch.
- Rhododendron sanctum Nakai
- Rhododendron sanguineum Franch.
- Rhododendron santapaui Sastry, S.K.Kataki, Peter Cox, Patricia Cox & P.Hutchison
- Rhododendron × sarcodes Argent & Madulid
- Rhododendron sargentianum Rehder & E.H.Wilson
- Rhododendron × satsumense Hatus.
- Rhododendron saxatile B.Y.Ding & Y.Y.Fang
- Rhododendron saxicola Sleumer
- Rhododendron saxifragoides J.J.Sm.
- Rhododendron sayeri Sleumer
- Rhododendron scabridibracteum Sleumer
- Rhododendron scabrifolium Franch.
- Rhododendron scabrum G.Don
- Rhododendron scarlatinum Sleumer
- Rhododendron schistocalyx Balf.f. & Forrest
- Rhododendron schizostigma Sleumer
- Rhododendron schlechteri Lauterb.
- Rhododendron schlippenbachii Maxim.
- Rhododendron × schoddei Sleumer
- Rhododendron scopulorum Hutch.
- Rhododendron scopulum (G.Z.Li) G.Z.Li
- Rhododendron scortechinii King & Gamble
- Rhododendron searleanum Sleumer
- Rhododendron searsiae Rehder & E.H.Wilson
- Rhododendron seimundii J.J.Sm.
- Rhododendron seinghkuense Kingdon-Ward
- Rhododendron × sekimori Komatsu
- Rhododendron selense Franch.
- Rhododendron semibarbatum Maxim.
- Rhododendron semnoides Tagg & Forrest
- Rhododendron seniavinii Maxim.
- Rhododendron seranicum J.J.Sm.
- Rhododendron serotinum Hutch.
- Rhododendron serpyllifolium (A.Gray) Miq.
- Rhododendron serrulatum (Small) Millais
- Rhododendron sessilifolium J.J.Sm.
- Rhododendron setiferum Balf.f. & Forrest
- Rhododendron setosum D.Don
- Rhododendron shanii W.P.Fang
- Rhododendron shaoakouense S.S.Ying
- Rhododendron × sheilae Sleumer
- Rhododendron sherriffii Cowan
- Rhododendron shimenense Q.X.Liu & C.M.Zhang
- Rhododendron shimianense W.P.Fang & P.S.Liu
- Rhododendron shingbae C.S.Purohit & Ram.Kumar
- Rhododendron shweliense Balf.f. & Forrest
- Rhododendron sichotense Pojark.
- Rhododendron sidereum Balf.f.
- Rhododendron siderophyllum Franch.
- Rhododendron sikangense W.P.Fang
- Rhododendron sikayotaizanense Masam.
- Rhododendron × silvicola (Sleumer) Argent, A.Lamb, Phillipps & Collen.
- Rhododendron simiarum Hance
- Rhododendron simsii Planch.
- Rhododendron simulans J.J.Sm. ex Sleumer
- Rhododendron sinofalconeri Balf.f.
- Rhododendron sinogrande Balf.f. & W.W.Sm.
- Rhododendron × sinosimulans D.F.Chamb.
- Rhododendron siobriense Argent
- Rhododendron smirnowii Trautv. ex Regel
- Rhododendron smokianum Ralf Bauer & Albach
- Rhododendron × sochadzeae Kharadze & Davlian.
- Rhododendron sohayakiense Y.Watan. & T.Yukawa
- Rhododendron sojolense Argent
- Rhododendron solitarium Sleumer
- Rhododendron sophistarum Craven
- Rhododendron sororium Sleumer
- Rhododendron souliei Franch.
- Rhododendron spanotrichum Balf.f. & W.W.Sm.
- Rhododendron sparsifolium W.P.Fang
- Rhododendron spathulatum Ridl.
- Rhododendron sperabile Balf.f. & Farrer
- Rhododendron sperabiloides Tagg & Forrest
- Rhododendron sphaeroblastum Balf.f. & Forrest
- Rhododendron spiciferum Franch.
- Rhododendron spilotum Balf.f. & Farrer
- Rhododendron spinuliferum Franch.
- Rhododendron spondylophyllum F.Muell.
- Rhododendron stamineum Franch.
- Rhododendron stanleyi S.James & Argent
- Rhododendron stapfianum Hemsl. ex Prain
- Rhododendron starlingii Rushforth & N.T.T.Huong
- Rhododendron stelligerum Sleumer
- Rhododendron stenopetalum (R.Hogg) Mabb.
- Rhododendron stenophyllum Hook.f. ex Stapf
- Rhododendron stevensianum Sleumer
- Rhododendron stewartianum Diels
- Rhododendron stolleanum Schltr.
- Rhododendron stresemannii J.J.Sm.
- Rhododendron strigillosum Franch.
- Rhododendron strigosum R.L.Liu
- Rhododendron suaveolens Sleumer
- Rhododendron subansiriense D.F.Chamb. & Cox
- Rhododendron subcerinum P.C.Tam
- Rhododendron subcrenulatum Sleumer
- Rhododendron subenerve P.C.Tam
- Rhododendron subestipitatum P.C.Tam
- Rhododendron subflumineum P.C.Tam
- Rhododendron subpacificum Sleumer
- Rhododendron subroseum Xiang Chen & Jia Y.Huang
- Rhododendron subsessile Rendle
- Rhododendron subulatum (Nakai) Harmaja
- Rhododendron subuliferum Sleumer
- Rhododendron subulosum J.J.Sm. ex Sleumer
- Rhododendron succothii Davidian
- Rhododendron sugaui Argent
- Rhododendron sulfureum Franch.
- Rhododendron sumatranum Merr.
- Rhododendron × sundarraianum Sherpa & Gogoi
- Rhododendron suoilenhense D.F.Chamb., N.T.T.Huong & Rushforth
- Rhododendron superbum Sleumer
- Rhododendron sutchuenense Franch.
- Rhododendron syringoideum Sleumer

== T ==
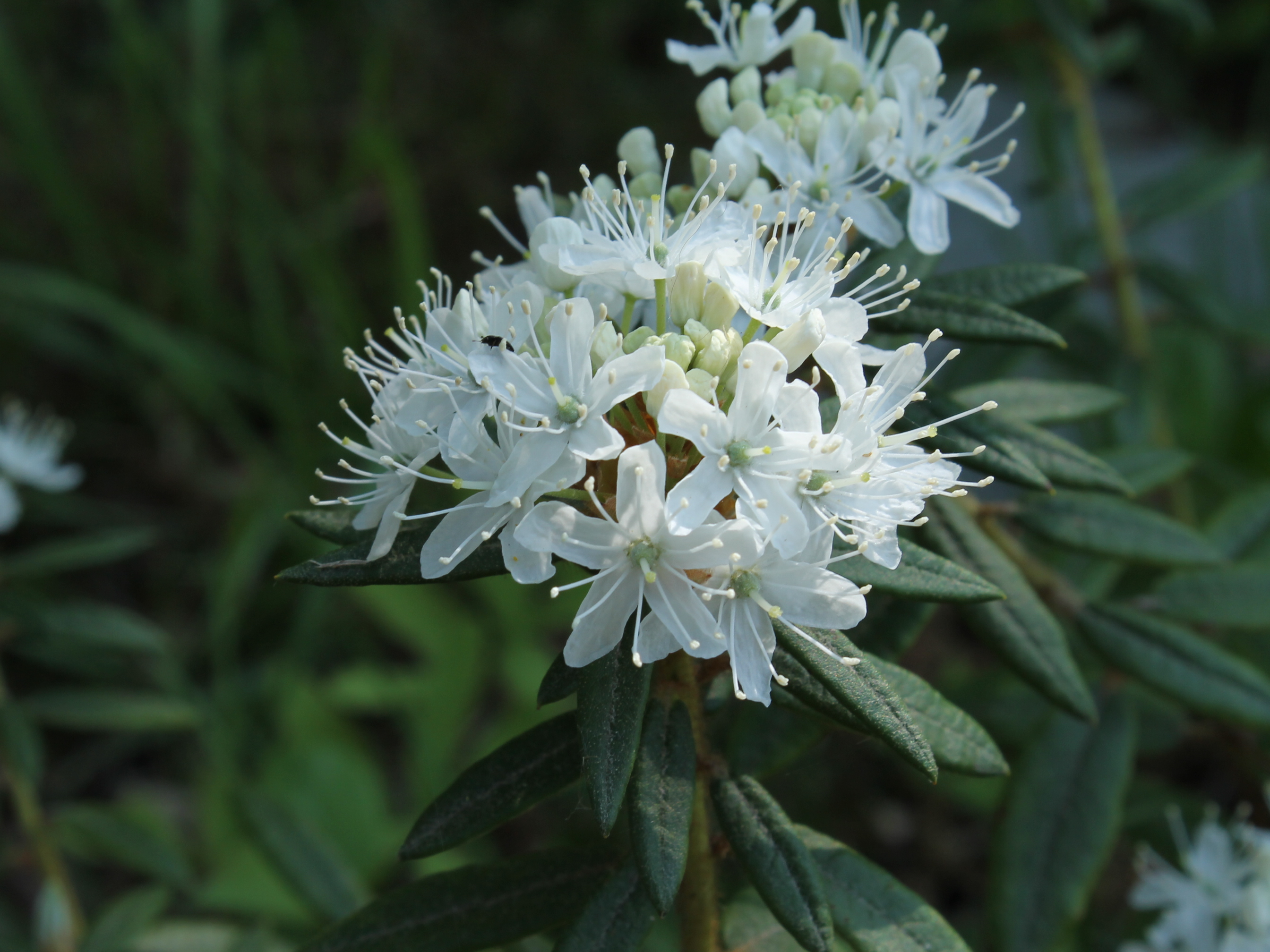
Rhododendron tomentosum

- Rhododendron taggianum Hutch.
- Rhododendron taibaiense Ching & H.P.Yang
- Rhododendron taiense Hutch.
- Rhododendron taipaoense T.C.Wu & P.C.Tam
- Rhododendron taishunense B.Y.Ding & Y.Y.Fang
- Rhododendron taiwanalpinum Ohwi
- Rhododendron × takahashianum Sugim.
- Rhododendron takeuchii Argent
- Rhododendron taliense Franch.
- Rhododendron tanastylum Balf.f. & Kingdon-Ward
- Rhododendron tapetiforme Balf.f. & Kingdon-Ward
- Rhododendron taronense Hutch.
- Rhododendron tashiroi Maxim.
- Rhododendron tatsienense Franch.
- Rhododendron × tatuoi Nakai ex H.Hara
- Rhododendron taxifolium Merr.
- Rhododendron taxoides J.J.Sm.
- Rhododendron telmateium Balf.f. & W.W.Sm.
- Rhododendron temenium Balf.f. & Forrest
- Rhododendron tenuifolium R.C.Fang & S.H.Huang
- Rhododendron tenuilaminare P.C.Tam
- Rhododendron tephropeploides R.A.Baines & D.F.Chamb.
- Rhododendron tephropeplum Balf.f. & Farrer
- Rhododendron tetramerum (Makino) Nakai
- Rhododendron thaumasianthum Sleumer
- Rhododendron thayerianum Rehder & E.H.Wilson
- Rhododendron thomsonii Hook.f.
- Rhododendron thymifolium Maxim.
- Rhododendron tianlinense P.C.Tam
- Rhododendron tianmenshanense C.L.Peng & L.H.Yan
- Rhododendron tingwuense P.C.Tam
- Rhododendron tintinnabellum Danet
- Rhododendron titapuriense A.A.Mao, K.N.E.Cox & D.F.Chamb.
- Rhododendron tjiasmantoi Mustaqim, Mambrasar & Hutabarat
- Rhododendron tolmachevii Harmaja
- Rhododendron tomentosum Harmaja
- Rhododendron torajaense Craven
- Rhododendron torquescens D.F.Chamb.
- Rhododendron tosaense Makino
- Rhododendron toxopei J.J.Sm.
- Rhododendron traillianum Forrest & W.W.Sm.
- Rhododendron trancongii Argent & Rushforth
- Rhododendron × transiens Nakai
- Rhododendron trichanthum Rehder
- Rhododendron trichocladum Franch.
- Rhododendron trichogynum L.C.Hu
- Rhododendron × trichophorum Balf.f.
- Rhododendron trichostomum Franch.
- Rhododendron triflorum Hook.f.
- Rhododendron trilectorum Cowan
- Rhododendron trinerve Franch. ex H.Boissieu
- Rhododendron triumphans Yersin & A.Chev.
- Rhododendron truncatovarium L.M.Gao & D.Z.Li
- Rhododendron truncicola Sleumer
- Rhododendron tsaii W.P.Fang
- Rhododendron tsariense Cowan
- Rhododendron tschonoskii Maxim.
- Rhododendron tsinlingense W.P.Fang ex J.Q.Fu
- Rhododendron tsoi Merr.
- Rhododendron tsurugisanense (T.Yamaz.) T.Yamaz.
- Rhododendron tsusiophyllum Sugim.
- Rhododendron tuba Sleumer
- Rhododendron tuberculiferum J.J.Sm.
- Rhododendron tubiforme (Cowan & Davidian) Davidian
- Rhododendron tuhanense Argent & T.J.Barkman
- Rhododendron tutcherae Hemsl. & E.H.Wilson

== U ==
- Rhododendron ultimum Wernham
- Rhododendron unciferum P.C.Tam
- Rhododendron ungeonticum A.P.Khokhr. & Mazurenko
- Rhododendron ungernii Trautv. ex Regel
- Rhododendron uniflorum Hutch. & Kingdon-Ward
- Rhododendron urophyllum W.P.Fang
- Rhododendron uvariifolium Diels
- Rhododendron uwaense H.Hara & T.Yamanaka

== V ==
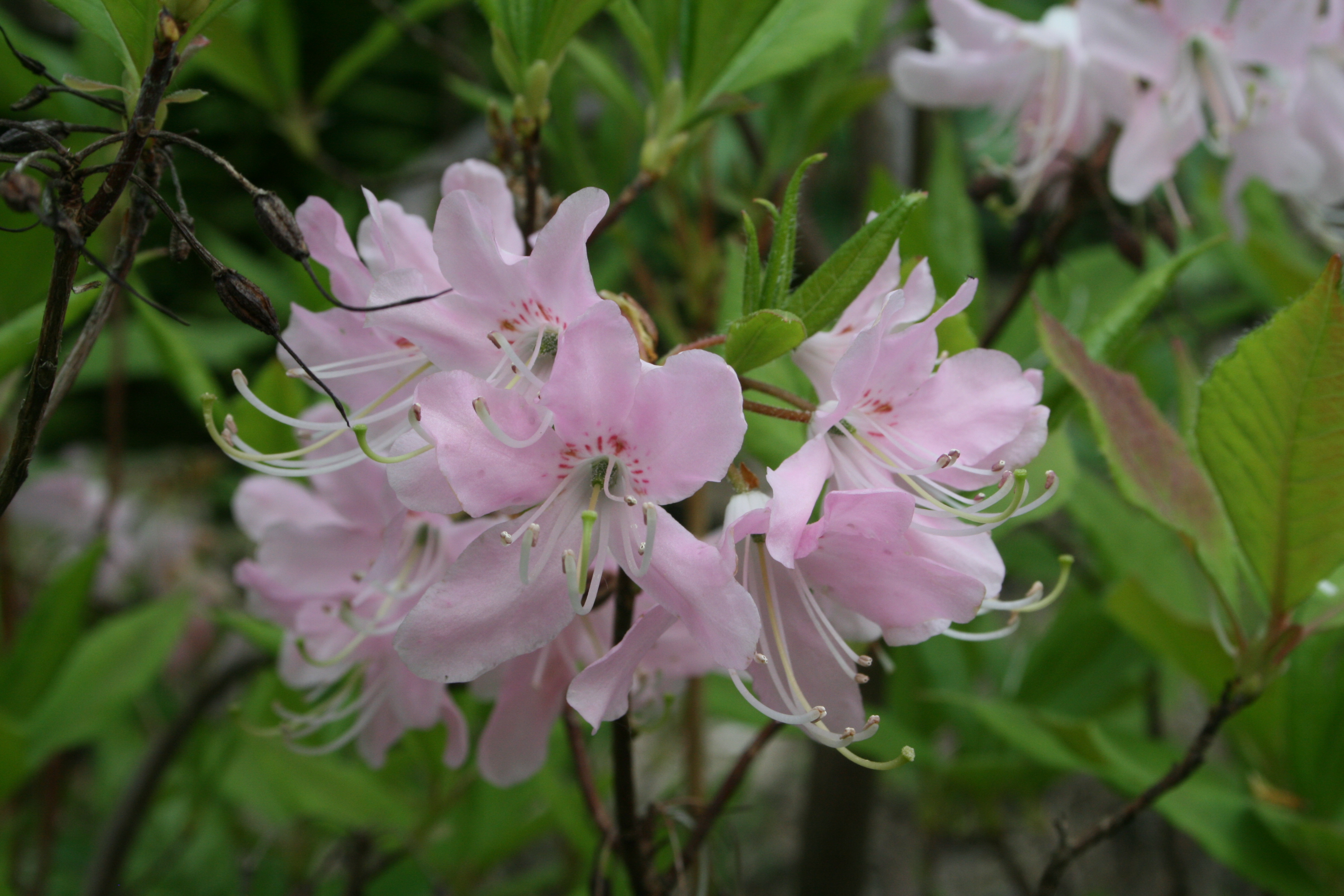
Rhododendron vaseyi

- Rhododendron vaccinioides Hook.f.
- Rhododendron valentinianum Forrest ex Hutch.
- Rhododendron vanderbiltianum Merr.
- Rhododendron × vanhoeffenii Abrom.
- Rhododendron vaniotii H.Lév.
- Rhododendron vanvuurenii J.J.Sm.
- Rhododendron × variolosum Becc.
- Rhododendron vaseyi A.Gray
- Rhododendron veitchianum Hook.
- Rhododendron vellereum Hutch. ex Tagg
- Rhododendron venator Tagg ex L.Rothsch.
- Rhododendron vernicosum Franch.
- Rhododendron verruciferum W.K.Hu
- Rhododendron × verruculosum Rehder & E.H.Wilson
- Rhododendron versteegii J.J.Sm.
- Rhododendron verticillatum H.Low ex Lindl.
- Rhododendron vesiculiferum Tagg
- Rhododendron vialii Delavay & Franch.
- Rhododendron vidalii Rolfe
- Rhododendron villosulum J.J.Sm.
- Rhododendron vinicolor Sleumer
- Rhododendron vinkii Sleumer
- Rhododendron virgatum Hook.f.
- Rhododendron viridescens Hutch.
- Rhododendron viriosum Craven
- Rhododendron viscidifolium Davidian
- Rhododendron viscidum C.Z.Guo & Z.H.Liu
- Rhododendron viscigemmatum P.C.Tam
- Rhododendron viscistylum Nakai
- Rhododendron viscosum (L.) Torr.
- Rhododendron vitis-idaea Sleumer

== W ==
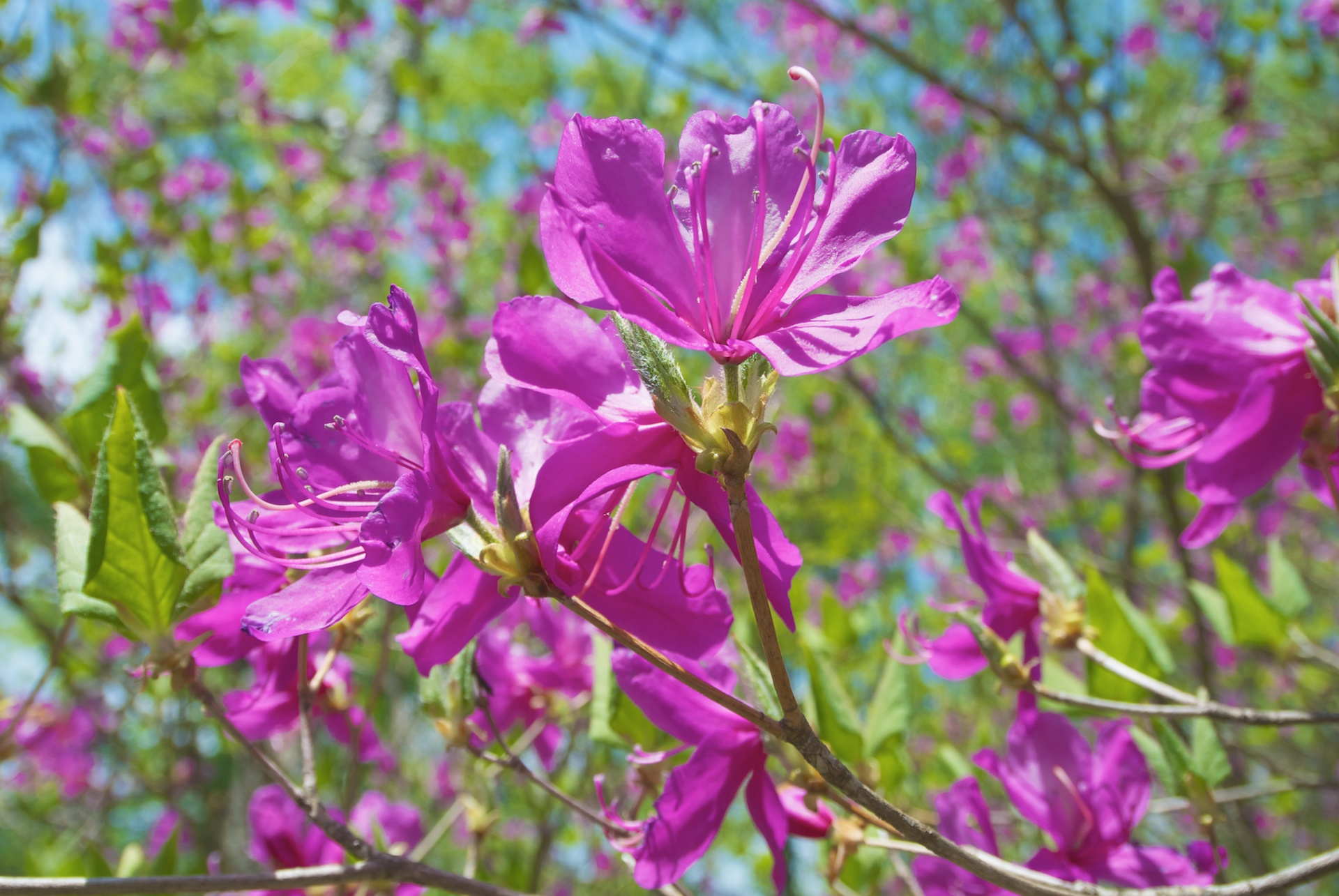
Rhododendron wadanum

- Rhododendron wadanum Makino
- Rhododendron walongense Kingdon-Ward
- Rhododendron wardii W.W.Sm.
- Rhododendron wasonii Hemsl. & E.H.Wilson
- Rhododendron watsonii Hemsl. & E.H.Wilson
- Rhododendron wattii Cowan
- Rhododendron websterianum Rehder & E.H.Wilson
- Rhododendron × welleslyanum Waterer ex Rehder
- Rhododendron wentianum Koord.
- Rhododendron westlandii Hemsl.
- Rhododendron weyrichii Maxim.
- Rhododendron whiteheadii Rendle
- Rhododendron widjajae Argent & Mambrasar
- Rhododendron wightii Hook.f.
- Rhododendron × wilhelminae Hochr.
- Rhododendron wilkiei Argent
- Rhododendron williamsianum Rehder & E.H.Wilson
- Rhododendron williamsii Merr. ex H.F.Copel.
- Rhododendron wiltonii Hemsl. & E.H.Wilson
- Rhododendron wolongense W.K.Hu
- Rhododendron womersleyi Sleumer
- Rhododendron wongii Hemsl. & E.H.Wilson
- Rhododendron wrayi King & Gamble
- Rhododendron wrightianum Koord.
- Rhododendron wumingense W.P.Fang
- Rhododendron wuyishanicum L.K.Ling

== X ==
- Rhododendron × xanthanthum (Tagg & Forrest) D.F.Chamb.
- Rhododendron xanthopetalum Merr.
- Rhododendron xanthostephanum Merr.
- Rhododendron xenium Gill.K.Br. & Craven
- Rhododendron xiangganense X.F.Jin & B.Y.Ding
- Rhododendron xiaoxidongense W.K.Hu
- Rhododendron xiaoxueshanense R.L.Liao & Y.P.Ma
- Rhododendron xichangense Z.J.Zhao
- Rhododendron xiguense Ching & H.P.Yang
- Rhododendron xishuiense C.H.Yang & C.D.Yang

== Y ==
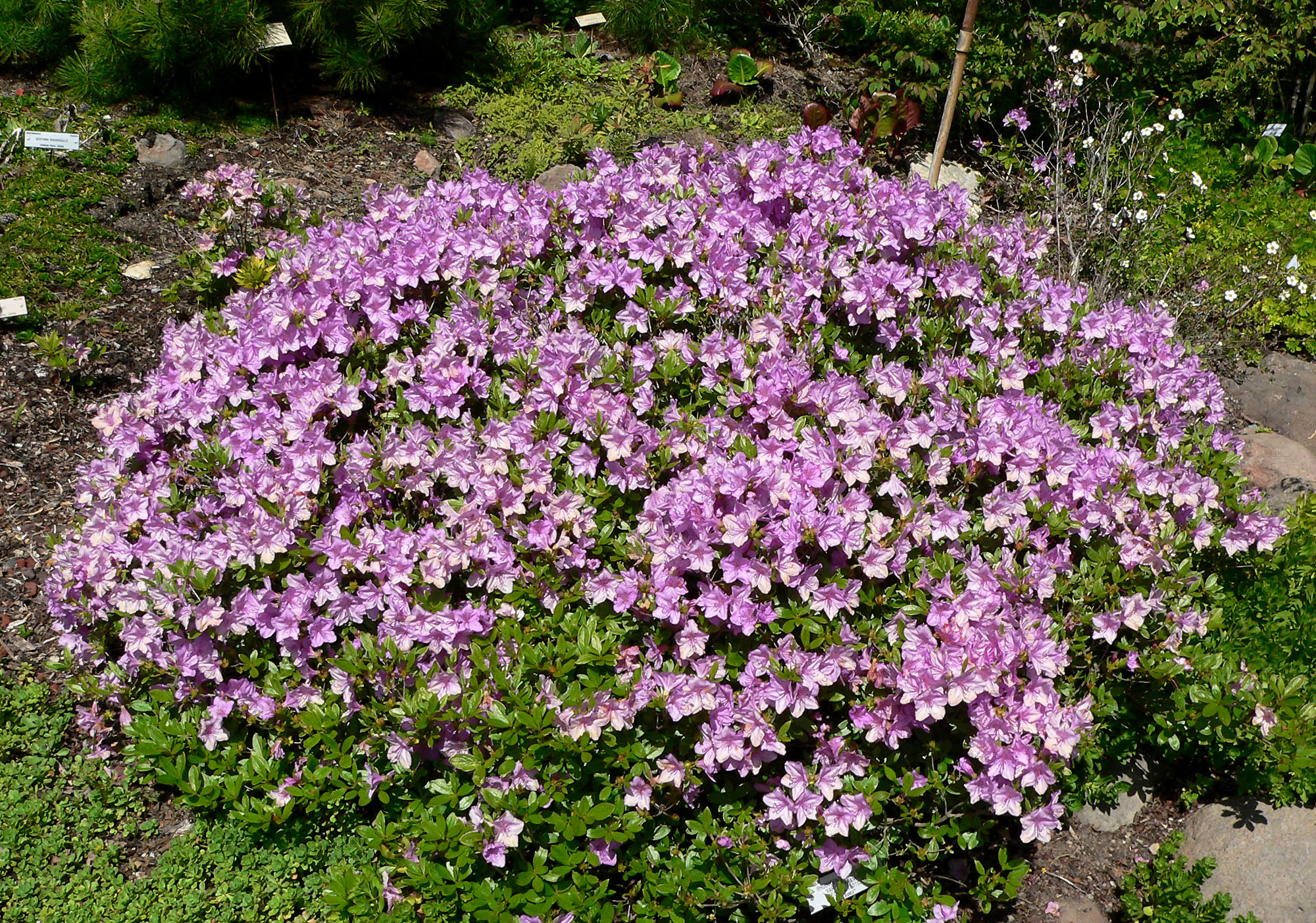
Rhododendron yedoense var. poukhanense

- Rhododendron yakuinsulare Masam.
- Rhododendron yakumontanum (T.Yamaz.) T.Yamaz.
- Rhododendron yakushimanum Nakai
- Rhododendron yakushimense (M.Tash. & H.Hatta) Craven
- Rhododendron yangmingshanense P.C.Tam
- Rhododendron yaogangxianense Q.X.Liu
- Rhododendron yaoshanense L.M.Gao & S.D.Zhang
- Rhododendron yaoshanicum W.P.Fang & M.Y.He
- Rhododendron yedoense Maxim. ex Regel
- Rhododendron yelliottii Warb.
- Rhododendron yizhangense Q.X.Liu
- Rhododendron yongii Argent
- Rhododendron yungchangense Cullen
- Rhododendron yungningense Balf.f. ex Hutch.
- Rhododendron yunnanense Franch.
- Rhododendron yunyianum X.F.Jin & B.Y.Ding
- Rhododendron yushuense Z.J.Zhao

== Z ==
- Rhododendron zaleucum Balf.f. & W.W.Sm.
- Rhododendron zekoense Y.D.Sun & Z.J.Zhao
- Rhododendron zhangjiajieense C.L.Peng & L.H.Yan
- Rhododendron zheguense Ching & H.P.Yang
- Rhododendron zhongdianense L.C.Hu
- Rhododendron ziyuanense P.C.Tam
- Rhododendron zoelleri Warb.
- Rhododendron zollingeri J.J.Sm.
