= Rhododendron smokianum =

Conservation status
- Imperiled (NatureServe)

Scientific classification
- Kingdom: Plantae
- Clade: Tracheophytes
- Clade: Angiosperms
- Clade: Eudicots
- Clade: Asterids
- Order: Ericales
- Family: Ericaceae
- Genus: Rhododendron
- Species: R. smokianum

Binomial name
- Rhododendron smokianum Ralf Bauer & Albach 2021

Species of plant

Rhododendron smokianum, the Great Smoky Mountain rhododendron, is a species of flowering plant in the family (Ericaceae) endemic to moderate to high elevations of the Great Smoky Mountains.
