= Rhododendron tsusiophyllum =

Scientific classification
- Kingdom: Plantae
- Clade: Tracheophytes
- Clade: Angiosperms
- Clade: Eudicots
- Clade: Asterids
- Order: Ericales
- Family: Ericaceae
- Genus: Rhododendron
- Species: R. tsusiophyllum

Binomial name
- Rhododendron tsusiophyllum Sugim.

Synonyms
- Rhododendron tanakae (Maxim.) Ohwi; Tsusiophyllum tanakae Maxim.

Species of plant

Rhododendron tsusiophyllum (syn. Tsusiophyllum tanakae) is a species of flowering plant in the family Ericaceae, native to Japan. An evergreen shrub reaching 0.3 m (1 ft), it is typically found growing about 500 m (1,600 ft) above sea level on southern Honshu and nearby smaller islands, such as the Izus. It is markedly different from other members of the genus Rhododendron in flower morphology and was once placed in its own genus, Tsusiophyllum.
