= Rhododendron petrocharis =

Scientific classification
- Kingdom: Plantae
- Clade: Embryophytes
- Clade: Tracheophytes
- Clade: Spermatophytes
- Clade: Angiosperms
- Clade: Eudicots
- Clade: Asterids
- Order: Ericales
- Family: Ericaceae
- Genus: Rhododendron
- Species: R. petrocharis

Binomial name
- Rhododendron petrocharis Diels

Species of flowering plant

Rhododendron petrocharis is a species of flowering plant in the family Ericaceae, native to north-central Sichuan, China. It was first described by Friedrich Ludwig Diels in 1921.
