= List of sections in subgenus Rhododendron =

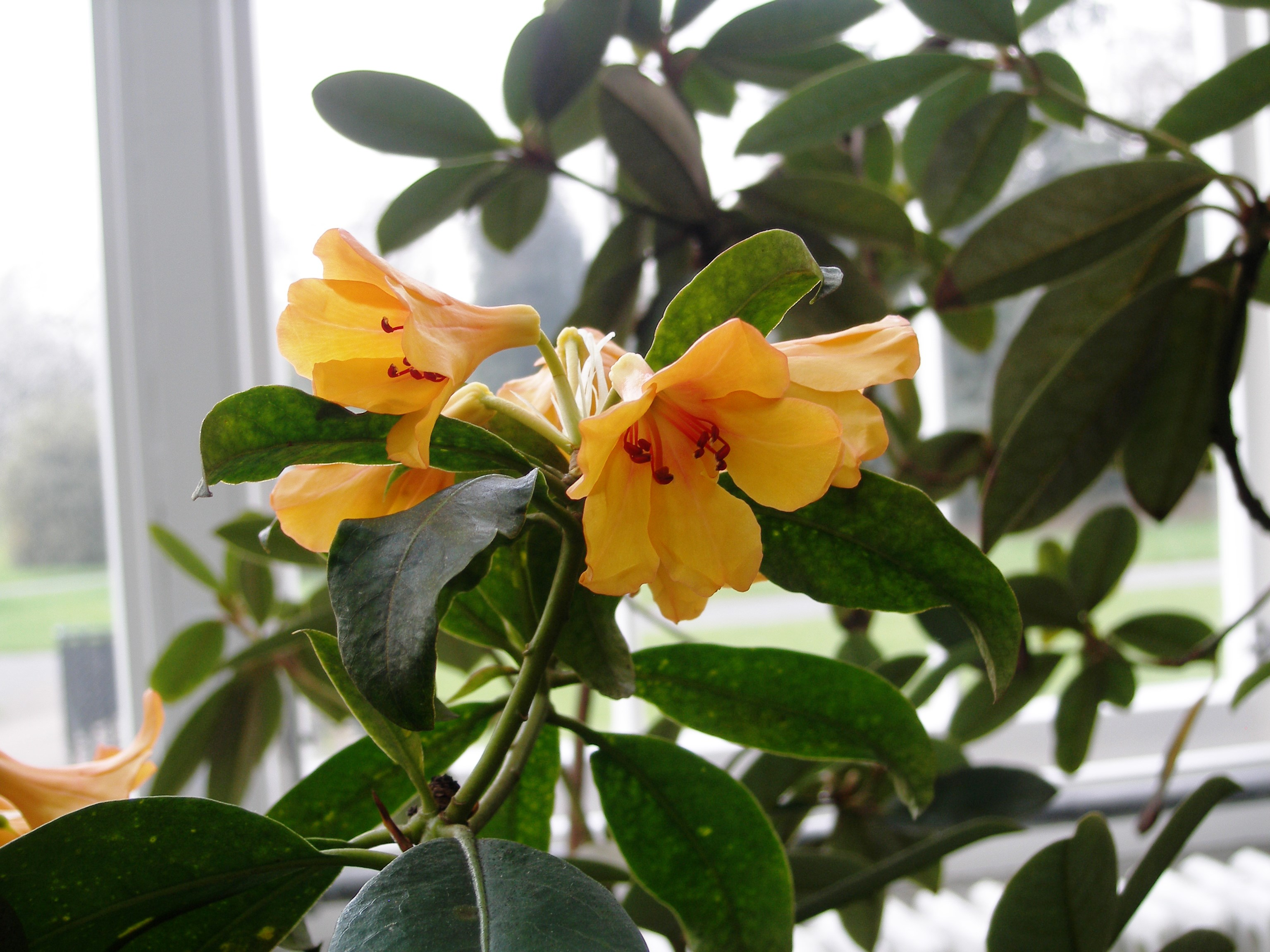
Rhododendron javanicum

Traditional to botanical taxonomy, subdivisions of taxonomic ranks further divide subgenera, sections, and subsections into species and subspecies/varieties. Genus Rhododendron consists of eight subgenera based on morphology; this page refers to only those lower divisions in subgenus Rhododendron, commonly known as the scaly or lepidote rhododendrons. Molecular evidence suggests that the subgenus Rhododendron is monophyletic, and the section Vireya is monophyletic as well with section Pogonanthum being nested within section Rhododendron. As evidenced by the following list, many subsections contain only one species, and many contain only one species that is followed by subspecies or varieties. Criteria for division into subsections may be subjective based on morphology. Recent studies have suggested a revision to the name of section Vireya; the section Vireya is referred to as Schistanthe, but contains all the subsections associated with the previous name. In this article, the two can be used interchangeably.

This list does not include known hybrids; because rhododendrons are known to hybridize readily, hybrid species are numerous and are not referenced in this list.

	Number of Subsections	Number of species
Pogonanthum	0	16
Rhododendron	28	179
Vireya/Schistanthe	7	183

- subgenus Rhododendron
  - section Pogonanthum
    - Rhododendron anthopogon
      - Rhododendron anthopogon ssp. anthopogon
      - Rhododendron anthopogon ssp. hypenanthum
    - Rhododendron anthopogonoides
    - Rhododendron cephalanthum
      - Rhododendron cephalanthum ssp. cephalanthum
      - Rhododendron cephalanthum ssp. platyphllum
    - Rhododendron collettianum
    - Rhododendron fragrans
    - Rhododendron kongboense
    - Rhododendron laudandum
      - Rhododendron laudandum var. laudandum
      - Rhododendron laudandum var. temoense
    - Rhododendron primuliflorum
    - Rhododendron sargentianum
    - Rhododendron trichostomum
    - Rhododendron rufescens
    - Rhododendron pogonophyllum
    - Rhododendron radendum
  - section Rhododendron
    - subsection Afghanica
      - Rhododendron afghanicum
    - subsection Baileya
      - Rhododendron baileyi
    - subsection Boothia
      - Rhododendron boothii
      - Rhododendron chrysodoron
      - Rhododendron dekatanum
      - Rhododendron leptocarpum
      - Rhododendron leucaspis
      - Rhododendron megeratum
      - Rhododendron sulfureum
    - subsection Camelliiflora
      - Rhododendron camelliiflorum
    - subsection Campylogynum
      - Rhododendron campylogynum
        - Rhododendron campylogynum var. leucanthum
        - Rhododendron campylogynum var. eupodum
    - subsection Caroliniana
      - Rhododendron minus
        - Rhododendron minus var. minus
        - Rhododendron minus var. champmanii
    - subsection Cinnabarinum
      - Rhododendron cinnabarinum
        - Rhododendron cinnabarinum ssp. cinnabarinum
        - Rhododendron cinnabarinum ssp. tamaense
        - Rhododendron cinnabarinum ssp. xanthocodon
      - Rhododendron keysii
    - subsection Edgeworthia
      - Rhododendron edgeworthii
      - Rhododendron pendulum
      - Rhododendron seinghkuense
    - subsection Fragariflora
      - Rhododendron fragariiflorum
    - subsection Genestieriana
      - Rhododendron genestierianum
    - subsection Glauca
      - Rhododendron brachyanthum
        - Rhododendron brachyanthum ssp. brachyanthum
        - Rhododendron brachyanthum ssp. hypolepidotum
      - Rhododendron charitopes
        - Rhododendron charitopes ssp. charitopes
        - Rhododendron charitopes ssp. tsangpoense
      - Rhododendron glaucophyllum
        - Rhododendron glaucophyllum var. glaucophyllum
        - Rhododendron glaucophyllum var. album
        - Rhododendron glaucophyllum var. tubiforme
      - Rhododendron luteiflorum
      - Rhododendron pruniflorum
      - Rhododendron shweliense
    - subsection Heliolepida
      - Rhododendron bracteatum
      - Rhododendron heliolepis
        - Rhododendron heliolepis var. heliolepis
        - Rhododendron heliolepis var. brevistylum
        - Rhododendron heliolepis var. fumidum
      - Rhododendron rubiginosum
    - subsection Lapponica
      - Rhododendron bulu
      - Rhododendron capitatum
      - Rhododendron complexum
      - Rhododendron cuneatum
      - Rhododendron dasypetalum
      - Rhododendron fastigiatum
      - Rhododendron flavidum
      - Rhododendron hippophaeoides
        - Rhododendron hippophaeoides var. hippophaeoides
        - Rhododendron hippophaeoides var. occidentale
      - Rhododendron impeditum
      - Rhododendron intricatum
      - Rhododendron lapponicum
      - Rhododendron nitidulum
        - Rhododendron nitidulum var. nitidulum
        - Rhododendron nitidulum var. omeiense
      - Rhododendron nivale
        - Rhododendron nivale ssp. nivale
        - Rhododendron nivale ssp. boreale
        - Rhododendron nivale ssp. australe
      - Rhododendron orthocladum
        - Rhododendron orthocladum var. orthocladum
        - Rhododendron orthocladum var. microleucum
      - Rhododendron polycladum
      - Rhododendron rupicola
        - Rhododendron rupicola var. chryseum
        - Rhododendron rupicola var. muliense
        - Rhododendron rupicola var. rupicola
      - Rhododendron russatum
      - Rhododendron setosum
      - Rhododendron tapetiforme
      - Rhododendron telmateium
      - Rhododendron thymiflolium
      - Rhododendron tsaii
      - Rhododendron websterianum
      - Rhododendron yungningense
    - subsection Ledum
      - Rhododendron columbianum
      - Rhododendron diversipilosum
      - Rhododendron groenlandicum
      - Rhododendron hypoleucum
      - Rhododendron neoglandulosum
      - Rhododendron subarticum
      - Rhododendron subulatum
      - Rhododendron tolmachevii
      - Rhododendron tomentosum
        - Rhododendron tomentosum var. tomentostrum
        - Rhododendron tomentosum var. palustre
    - subsection Lepidota
      - Rhododendron cowanianum
      - Rhododendron lepidotum
      - Rhododendron lowndesii
    - subsection Maddenia
      - Rhododendron burmanicum
      - Rhododendron carneum
      - Rhododendron ciliatum
      - Rhododendron coxianum
      - Rhododendron dalhousiae
        - Rhododendron dalhousiae var. dalhousiae
        - Rhododendron dalhousiae var. rhabdotum
      - Rhododendron dendricola
      - Rhododendron excellens
      - Rhododendron fletcherianum
      - Rhododendron formosum
        - Rhododendron formosum var. formosum
        - Rhododendron formosum var. inaequale
      - Rhododendron horlickianum
      - Rhododendron johnstoneanum
      - Rhododendron leptocladon
      - Rhododendron levinei
      - Rhododendron liliiflorum
      - Rhododendron lindleyi
      - Rhododendron ludwigianum
      - Rhododendron lyi
      - Rhododendron maddenii
        - Rhododendron maddenii ssp. maddenii
        - Rhododendron maddenii ssp. crassum
      - Rhododendron megacalyx
      - Rhododendron nuttallii
      - Rhododendron pachypodum
      - Rhododendron pseudociliipes
      - Rhododendron roseatum
      - Rhododendron scopulorum
      - Rhododendron taggianum
      - Rhododendron valentinianum
      - Rhododendron veitchianum
      - Rhododendron walongense
    - subsection Micrantha
      - Rhododendron micranthum
    - subsection Monantha
      - Rhododendron monanthum
    - subsection Moupinensia
      - Rhododendron dendrocharis
      - Rhododendron moupinense
      - Rhododendron petrocharis
    - subsection Rhododendron
      - Rhododendron ferrugineum
      - Rhododendron hirsutum
      - Rhododendron myrtifolium
    - subsection Rhodorastra
      - Rhododendron dauricum
      - Rhododendron mucronulatum
        - Rhododendron mucronulatum var. mucronulatum
        - Rhododendron mucronulatum var. taquetii
      - Rhododendron sichotense
    - subsection Saluenensia
      - Rhododendron calostrotum
        - Rhododendron calostrotum ssp. calostrotum
        - Rhododendron calostrotum ssp. riparium
        - Rhododendron calostrotum ssp. riparioides
        - Rhododendron calostrotum ssp. keleticum
      - Rhododendron saluenense
        - Rhododendron saluenense ssp. saluenense
        - Rhododendron saluenense ssp. chameunum
    - subsection Scabrifolia
      - Rhododendron hemitrichotum
      - Rhododendron mollicomum
      - Rhododendron pubescens
      - Rhododendron racemosum
      - Rhododendron scabrifolium
        - Rhododendron scabrifolium var. scabrifolium
        - Rhododendron scabrifolium var. spiciferum
      - Rhododendron spinuliferum
    - subsection Tephropepia
      - Rhododendron auritum
      - Rhododendron hanceanum
      - Rhododendron longistylum
      - Rhododendron tephropeplum
      - Rhododendron xanthostephanum
    - subsection Trichoclada
      - Rhododendron caesium
      - Rhododendron lepidostylum
      - Rhododendron mekongense
        - Rhododendron mekongense var. mekongense
        - Rhododendron mekongense var. rubrolineatum
      - Rhododendron trichocladum
      - Rhododendron viridescens
    - subsection Triflora
      - Rhododendron ambiguum
      - Rhododendron augustinii
        - Rhododendron augustinii ssp. augustinii
        - Rhododendron augustinii ssp. chasmanthum
        - Rhododendron augustinii ssp. hardyi
        - Rhododendron augustinii ssp. rubrum
      - Rhododendron bivelatum
      - Rhododendron concinnum
      - Rhododendron keiskei
      - Rhododendron keiskei var. keiski
      - Rhododendron keiskei var. ozawae
      - Rhododendron lutescens
      - Rhododendron polylepis
      - Rhododendron seariane
      - Rhododendron trichanthum
      - Rhododendron triflorum
      - Rhododendron zaleucum
        - Rhododendron zaleucum var. zaleucum
        - Rhododendron zaleucum var. flaviflorum
      - Rhododendron davidsonianum
      - Rhododendron rigidum
      - Rhododendron siderophyllum
      - Rhododendron tatsienense
      - Rhododendron yunnanense
      - Rhododendron oreotrephes
    - subsection Uniflora
      - Rhododendron imperator
      - Rhododendron ludlowii
      - Rhododendron pemakoense
      - Rhododendron pumilum
      - Rhododendron uniflorum
    - subsection Virgata
      - Rhododendron virgatum
        - Rhododendron virgatum ssp. virgatum
        - Rhododendron virgatum ssp. oleifolium
  - section Vireya/Schistanthe
    - subsection Euvireya
      - Malesia group
        - Rhododendron abietifolium
        - Rhododendron acrophilum
        - Rhododendron bagobonum
        - Rhododendron brassii
        - Rhododendron burttii
        - Rhododendron buxifolium
        - Rhododendron citrinum
        - Rhododendron commonae
        - Rhododendron cornu-bovis
        - Rhododendron flavoviride
        - Rhododendron helodes
        - Rhododendron inconspicuum
        - Rhododendron meijeri
        - Rhododendron multicolor
        - Rhododendron nieuwenhuisii
        - Rhododendron pauciflorum
        - Rhododendron pseudobuxifolium
        - Rhododendron pubigermen
        - Rhododendron rhodostomum
        - Rhododendron rousei
        - Rhododendron stevensianum
        - Rhododendron subcrenulatum
        - Rhododendron subuliferum
        - Rhododendron taxifolium
        - Rhododendron tuhanensis
        - Rhododendron vidalii
        - Rhododendron vitis-idaea
        - Rhododendron wrightianum
      - Solenovireya group
        - Rhododendron alborugosum
        - Rhododendron archboldianum
        - Rhododendron armitii
        - Rhododendron carrii
        - Rhododendron carringtoniae
        - Rhododendron cruttwellii
        - Rhododendron edanoi
        - Rhododendron goodenoughii
        - Rhododendron jasminiflorum
        - Rhododendron lambianum
        - Rhododendron loranthiflorum
        - Rhododendron majus
        - Rhododendron multinervium
        - Rhododendron niveoflorum
        - Rhododendron pleianthum
        - Rhododendron radians
        - Rhododendron rhodoleucum
        - Rhododendron roseiflorum
        - Rhododendron ruttenii
        - Rhododendron stapfianum
        - Rhododendron suaveolens
        - Rhododendron tuba
      - Euvireya group
        - Rhododendron alticola
        - Rhododendron arfakianum
        - Rhododendron aurigeranum
        - Rhododendron baconii
        - Rhododendron baenitzianum
        - Rhododendron blackii
        - Rhododendron bloembergenii
        - Rhododendron celebicum
        - Rhododendron christianae
        - Rhododendron crassifolium
        - Rhododendron culminicola
        - Rhododendron curviflorum
        - Rhododendron exuberans
        - Rhododendron glabriflorum
        - Rhododendron impositum
        - Rhododendron intranervatum
        - Rhododendron javanicum
        - Rhododendron kochii
        - Rhododendron laetum
        - Rhododendron lanceolatum
        - Rhododendron leptobrachion
        - Rhododendron leucogigas
        - Rhododendron lochiae
        - Rhododendron longiflorum
        - Rhododendron lowii
        - Rhododendron luraluense
        - Rhododendron macgregoriae
        - Rhododendron madulidii
        - Rhododendron maxwellii
        - Rhododendron mendumiae
        - Rhododendron nervulosum
        - Rhododendron orbiculatum
        - Rhododendron pachystima
        - Rhododendron polyanthemum
        - Rhododendron praetervisum
        - Rhododendron rarilepidotum
        - Rhododendron renschianum
        - Rhododendron retivenium
        - Rhododendron rhodopus
        - Rhododendron robinsonii
        - Rhododendron rugosum
        - Rhododendron salicifolium
        - Rhododendron scabridibracteum
        - Rhododendron seranicum
        - Rhododendron sessilifolium
        - Rhododendron stenophylum
        - Rhododendron sumatranum
        - Rhododendron vanvuurenii
        - Rhododendron verticilliatum
        - Rhododendron viriosum
        - Rhododendron williamsii
        - Rhododendron yongii
        - Rhododendron zoelleri
      - Linnaeopsis group
        - Rhododendron anagalliflorum
        - Rhododendron caespitosum
        - Rhododendron gracilentum
        - Rhododendron microphyllum
        - Rhododendron pusillum
        - Rhododendron rubineiflorum
        - Rhododendron schizostigma
        - Rhododendron womersleyi
      - Saxifragoidea group
        - Rhododendron saxafragoides
    - subsection Malyovireya
      - Rhododendron acuminatum
      - Rhododendron apoanum
      - Rhododendron durionifolium
      - Rhododendron fallanicum
      - Rhododendron himantodes
      - Rhododendron lamrialianum
      - Rhododendron lineare
      - Rhododendron malayanum
      - Rhododendron micromalayanum
      - Rhododendron vinicolor
    - subsection Discovireya
      - Rhododendron adinophyllum
      - Rhododendron borneense
      - Rhododendron cunefolium
      - Rhododendron ericoides
      - Rhododendron erosipetalum
      - Rhododendron gaultheriifolium
      - Rhododendron lindaueanum
      - Rhododendron meliphagidum
      - Rhododendron monodii
      - Rhododendron nanophyton
      - Rhododendron nummatum
      - Rhododendron perakense
      - Rhododendron pulleanum
      - Rhododendron quadrasianum
      - Rhododendron retusum
      - Rhododendron scortechinii
    - subsection Pseudovireya
      - Rhododendron densifolium
      - Rhododendron emarginatum
      - Rhododendron kawakamii
      - Rhododendron rushforthii
      - Rhododendron santapauii
      - Rhododendron vaccinoides
    - subsection Siphonovireya
      - Rhododendron agathodaemonis
      - Rhododendron dutartrei
      - Rhododendron habbemae
      - Rhododendron herzogii
      - Rhododendron inundatum
      - Rhododendron searleanum
    - subsection Albovireya
      - Rhododendron aequabile
      - Rhododendron album
      - Rhododendron arenicola
      - Rhododendron correoides
      - Rhododendron lagunculicarpum
      - Rhododendron pudorinum
      - Rhododendron versteegii
      - Rhododendron yelliotii
    - subsection Phaeovireya
      - Rhododendron beyerinckianum
      - Rhododendron bryophilum
      - Rhododendron caliginis
      - Rhododendron dianthosmum
      - Rhododendron dielsianum
      - Rhododendron evelyneae
      - Rhododendron eymae
      - Rhododendron gardenia
      - Rhododendron haematophthalmum
      - Rhododendron hellwigi
      - Rhododendron hyacinthosmum
      - Rhododendron kawir
      - Rhododendron konori
      - Rhododendron leptanthum
      - Rhododendron phaeochitum
      - Rhododendron phaeops
      - Rhododendron rarum
      - Rhododendron rhodochroum
      - Rhododendron rubellum
      - Rhododendron solitarium
      - Rhododendron superbum
      - Rhododendron tintinnabellum
      - Rhododendron truncicola
      - Rhododendron tuberculiferum

== See also ==
- List of Rhododendron species

== Bibliography ==
- “Vireya Species Gallery.” Edited by Chris Callard, Vireya.net, last updated 28 January 2015, vireya.net/gallery-sp.htm.
- Cox, Peter A. & Cox, Kenneth N. E. (1997). The Encyclopedia of Rhododendron Species. Glendoick Publishing. ISBN 0-9530533-0-X.
- Craven, L.A.; Goetsch, L.A.; Hall, B.D.; Brown, G.K. (2008). "Classification of the Vireya group of Rhododendron (Ericaceae)". Blumea - Biodiversity, Evolution and Biogeography of Plants. 53 (2): 435–442. doi:10.3767/000651908X608070.
- Cullen, J. (1980). "A revision of Rhododendron I. Subgenus Rhododendron sections Rhododendron and Pogonanthum". Notes from the Royal Botanic Garden Edinburgh. 39 (1). ISSN 0080-4274.
- Goetsch, L.A.; Craven, L.A.; Hall, B.D. (2011). "Major speciation accompanied the dispersal of Vireya Rhododendrons (Ericaceae, Rhododendron sect. Schistanthe) through the Malayan archipelago: Evidence from nuclear gene sequences". Taxon. 60 (4): 1015–1028.
- Goetsch, Loretta; Eckert, Andrew J.; Hall, Benjamin D. (July–September 2005). "The molecular systematics of Rhododendron (Ericaceae): a phylogeny based upon RPB2 gene sequences". Systematic Botany. 30 (3): 616–626. doi:10.1600/0363644054782170
