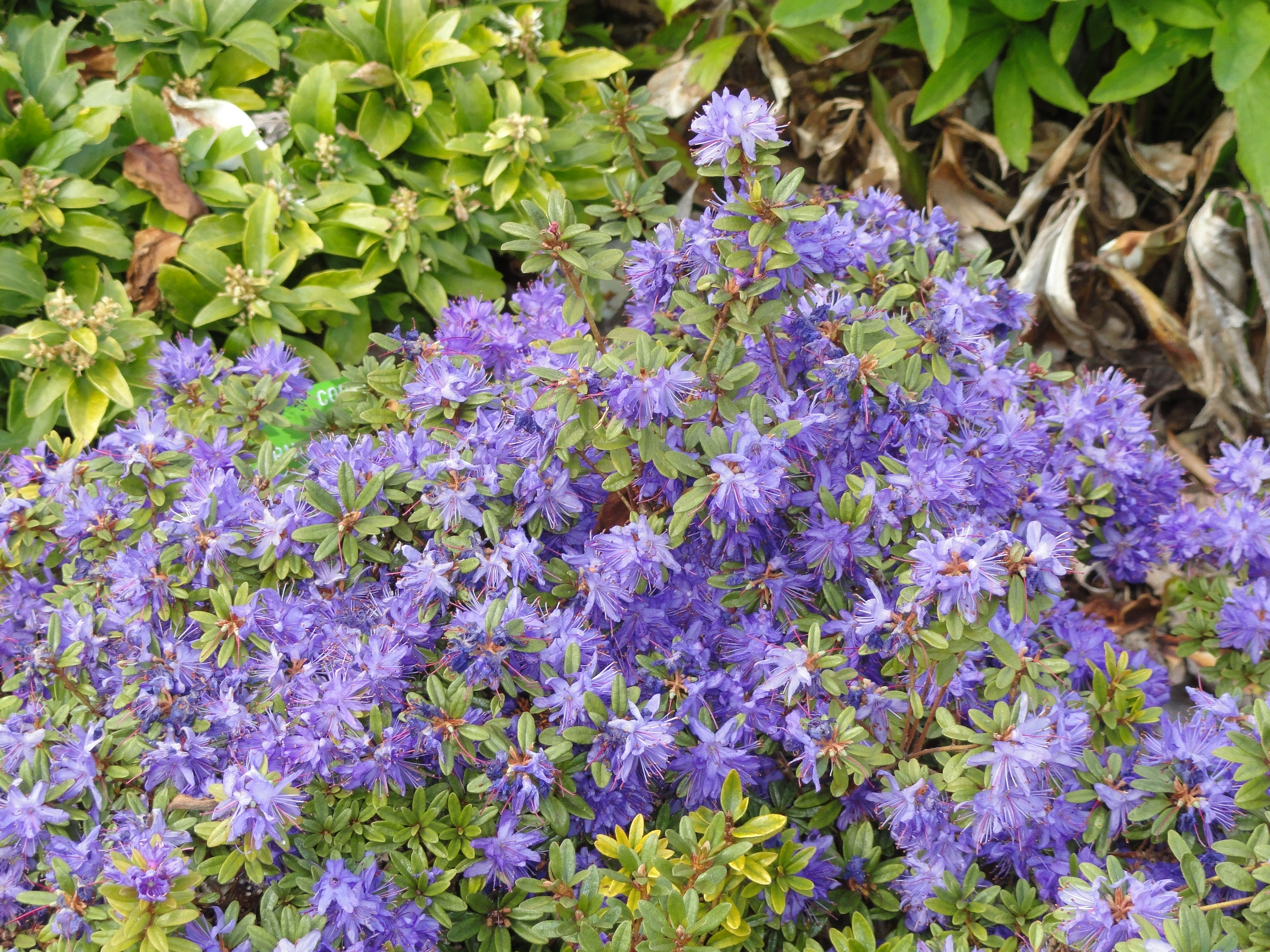

Scientific classification
- Kingdom: Plantae
- Clade: Tracheophytes
- Clade: Angiosperms
- Clade: Eudicots
- Clade: Asterids
- Order: Ericales
- Family: Ericaceae
- Genus: Rhododendron
- Species: R. polycladum

Binomial name
- Rhododendron polycladum Franch.

= Rhododendron polycladum =

Species of plant

Rhododendron polycladum (多枝杜鹃) is a rhododendron species native to central and northwestern Yunnan in China, where it grows at altitudes of 3,000–4,300 m (9,800–14,100 ft). It is an evergreen shrub that grows to 1.2 m (3.9 ft) in height, with leaves that are narrowly elliptic, oblong or lanceolate, 0.6–1.5 by 0.2–0.4 cm in size. The flowers are lavender to purple-blue.

== Synonyms ==
- Rhododendron compactum Hutch.
- Rhododendron scintillans Balf.f. & W.W.Sm.
