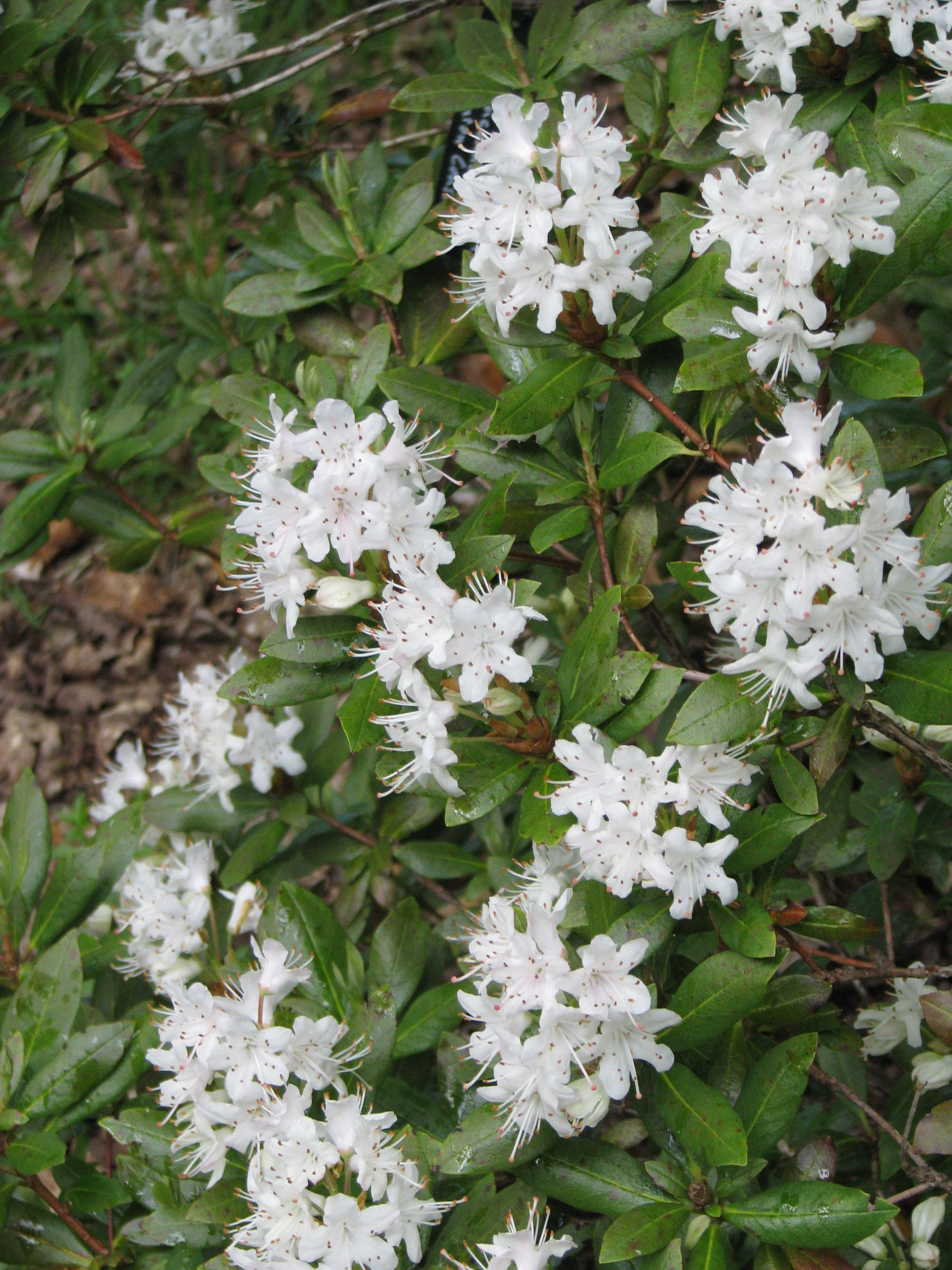
- Rhododendron hanceanum 'Canton Consul'

Scientific classification
- Kingdom: Plantae
- Clade: Embryophytes
- Clade: Tracheophytes
- Clade: Spermatophytes
- Clade: Angiosperms
- Clade: Eudicots
- Clade: Asterids
- Order: Ericales
- Family: Ericaceae
- Genus: Rhododendron
- Species: R. hanceanum

Binomial name
- Rhododendron hanceanum Hemsl.

Synonyms
- Azalea hanceana (Hemsl.) Kuntze; Rhododendron willmottiae R.H.Pearson

= Rhododendron hanceanum =

Species of flowering plant

Rhododendron hanceanum is a species of flowering plant in the genus Rhododendron native to south-central China. Its Nanum Group has gained the Royal Horticultural Society's Award of Garden Merit.
