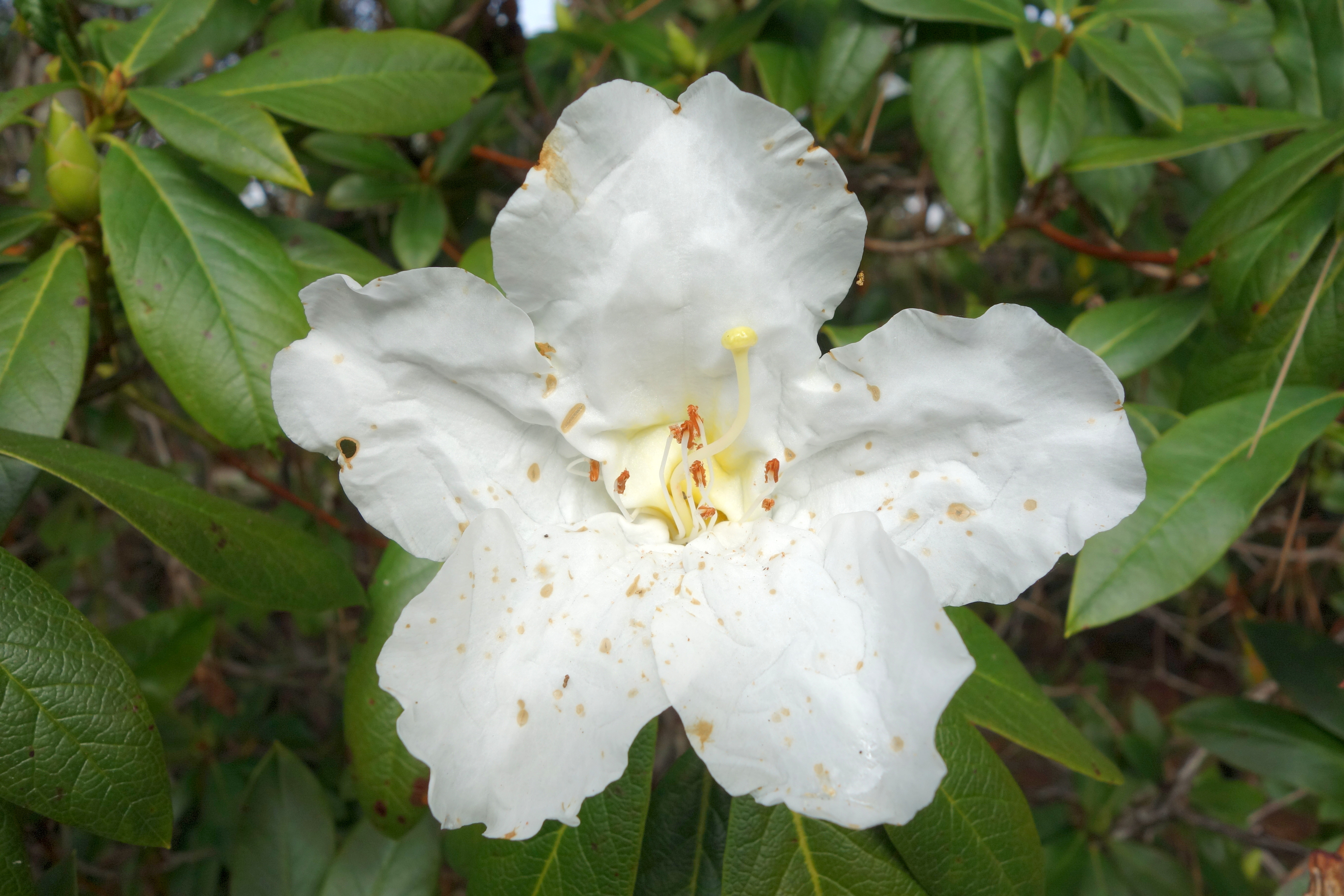

Scientific classification
- Kingdom: Plantae
- Clade: Tracheophytes
- Clade: Angiosperms
- Clade: Eudicots
- Clade: Asterids
- Order: Ericales
- Family: Ericaceae
- Genus: Rhododendron
- Species: R. liliiflorum

Binomial name
- Rhododendron liliiflorum H.Lév.

= Rhododendron liliiflorum =

Species of plant

Rhododendron liliiflorum (百合花杜鹃) is a rhododendron species native to Guangxi, Guizhou, Hunan, and southeast Yunnan, China, where it grows at altitudes of 2,800–4,500 m (9,200–14,800 ft). It is an evergreen shrub or small tree that grows to 3 m (9.8 ft) in height, with leathery, oblong leaves, 7–16 by 2–5 cm in size. The flowers are predominantly white.
