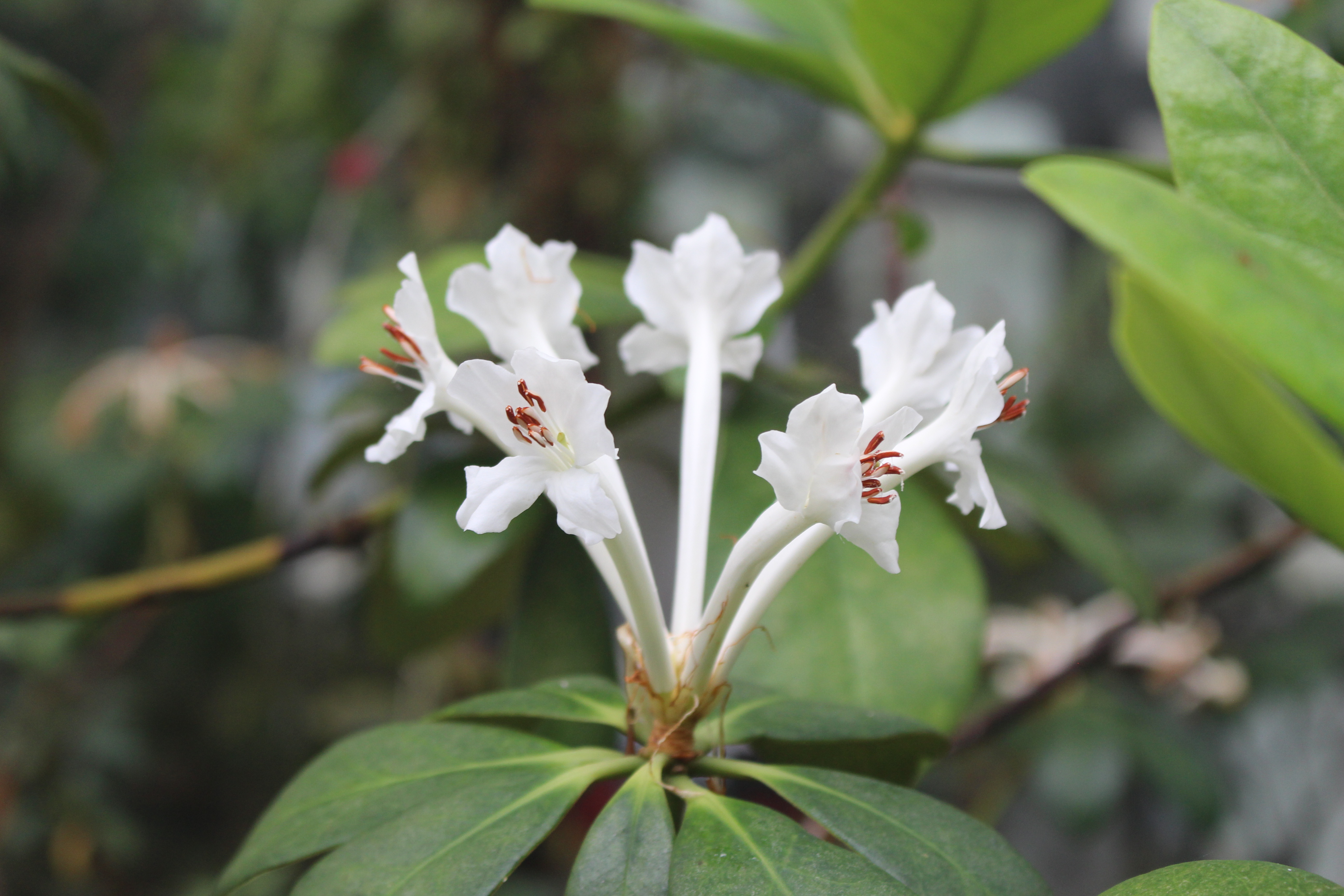

Scientific classification
- Kingdom: Plantae
- Clade: Tracheophytes
- Clade: Angiosperms
- Clade: Eudicots
- Clade: Asterids
- Order: Ericales
- Family: Ericaceae
- Genus: Rhododendron
- Species: R. goodenoughii

Binomial name
- Rhododendron goodenoughii Sleumer

= Rhododendron goodenoughii =

Species of plant

Rhododendron goodenoughii is a rhododendron species native to Papua New Guinea, particularly Goodenough Island where it grows at altitudes of 800–1,500 m (2,600–4,900 ft). It is a shrub or small tree that grows to 2 m (6.6 ft) in height, with leaves that are broadly elliptic, 10 × 6 cm in size. The flowers are trumpet-shaped, white, and fragrant.

This species does not tolerate freezing temperatures, so must be grown with protection in temperate zones.
