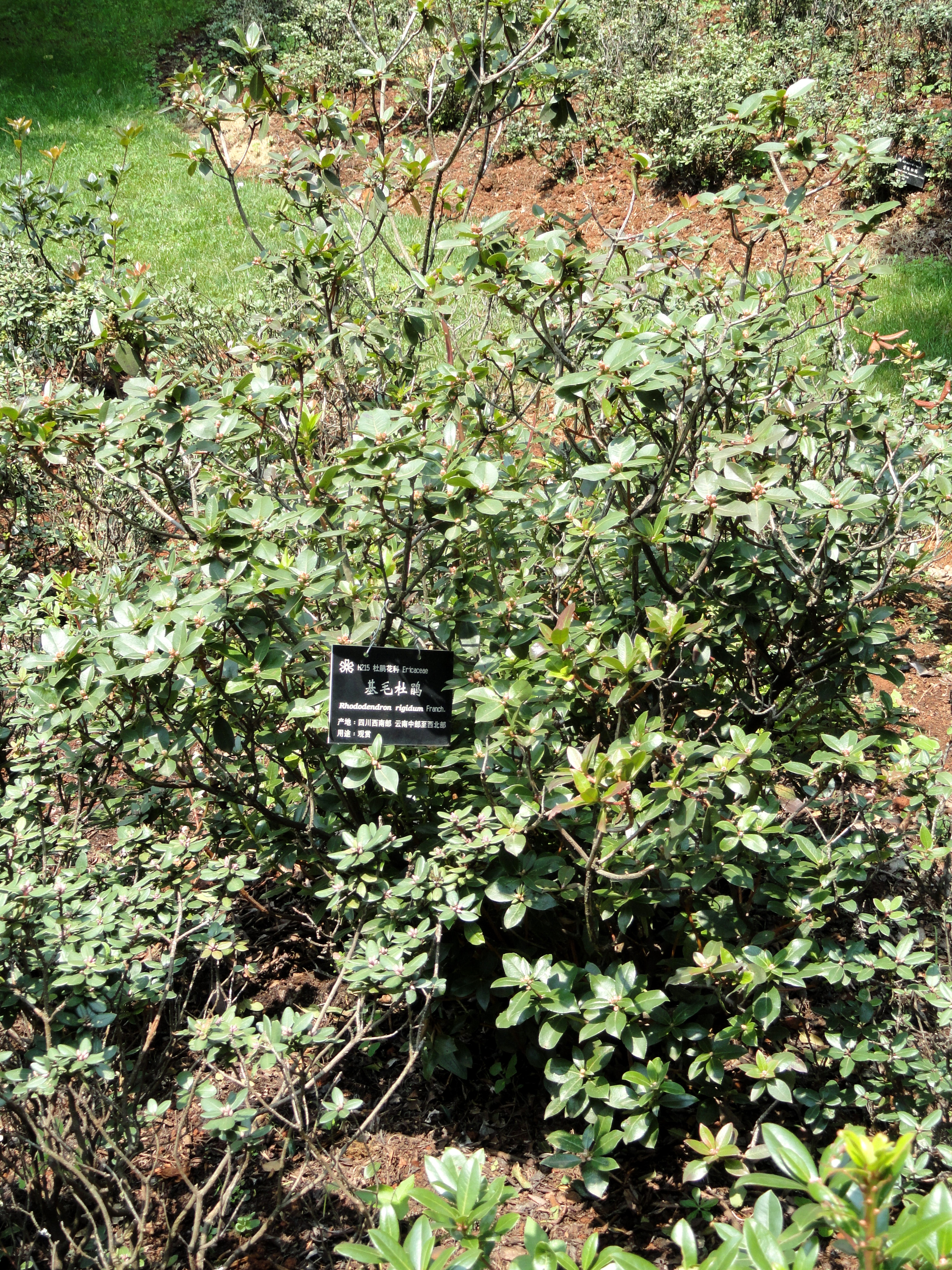

Scientific classification
- Kingdom: Plantae
- Clade: Tracheophytes
- Clade: Angiosperms
- Clade: Eudicots
- Clade: Asterids
- Order: Ericales
- Family: Ericaceae
- Genus: Rhododendron
- Species: R. rigidum

Binomial name
- Rhododendron rigidum Franch.

= Rhododendron rigidum =

Species of plant

Rhododendron rigidum (基毛杜鹃) is a rhododendron species native to Sichuan and Yunnan, China, where it grows at altitudes of 2,000–3,400 m (6,600–11,200 ft). Growing to 1–2 m (3.3–6.6 ft) in height, it is an evergreen shrub with leaves that are elliptic, oblong elliptic, oblong-lanceolate or oblanceolate, 2.5–6.8 by 1–3.2 cm in size. The flowers are white to reddish purple.

== Synonyms ==
- Rhododendron caeruleum H.Lév.
- Rhododendron eriandrum H.Lév. ex Hutch.
- Rhododendron hesperium Balf.f. & Forrest
- Rhododendron racemosum var. rigidum (Franch.) Rehnelt
- Rhododendron rarosquameum Balf.f.
- Rhododendron sycnanthum Balf.f. & W.W.Sm.
