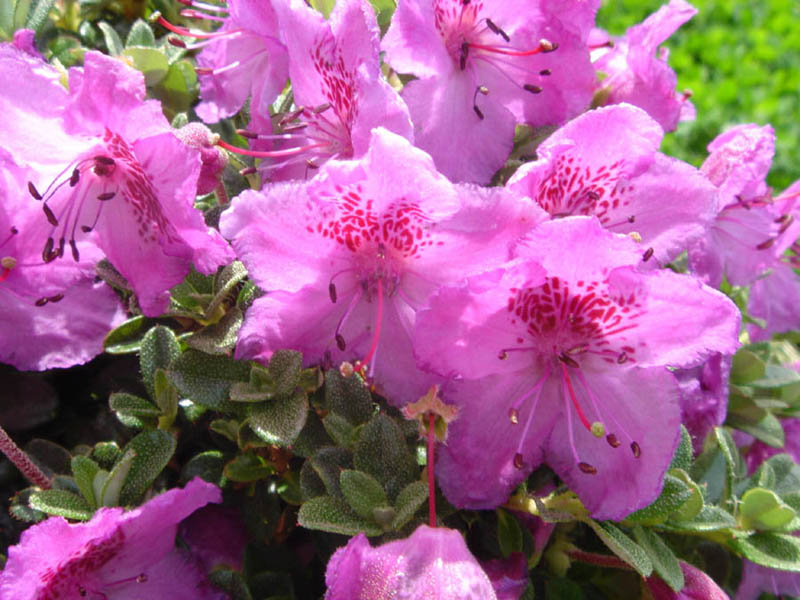
- Rhododendron calostrotum subsp. keleticum

Scientific classification
- Kingdom: Plantae
- Clade: Embryophytes
- Clade: Tracheophytes
- Clade: Spermatophytes
- Clade: Angiosperms
- Clade: Eudicots
- Clade: Asterids
- Order: Ericales
- Family: Ericaceae
- Genus: Rhododendron
- Species: R. calostrotum

Binomial name
- Rhododendron calostrotum Balf.f. & Kingdon-Ward

= Rhododendron calostrotum =

Species of flowering plant

Rhododendron calostrotum is a species of flowering plant in the genus Rhododendron native to Tibet, south-central China, and Myanmar. Its putative subspecies Rhododendron calostrotum subsp. keleticum, called the beautiful-covering rhododendron, and its cultivar 'Gigha' have both gained the Royal Horticultural Society's Award of Garden Merit.

== Supbspecies ==
The following subspecies are currently accepted:

- Rhododendron calostrotum subsp. riparium (Kingdon-Ward) Cullen
