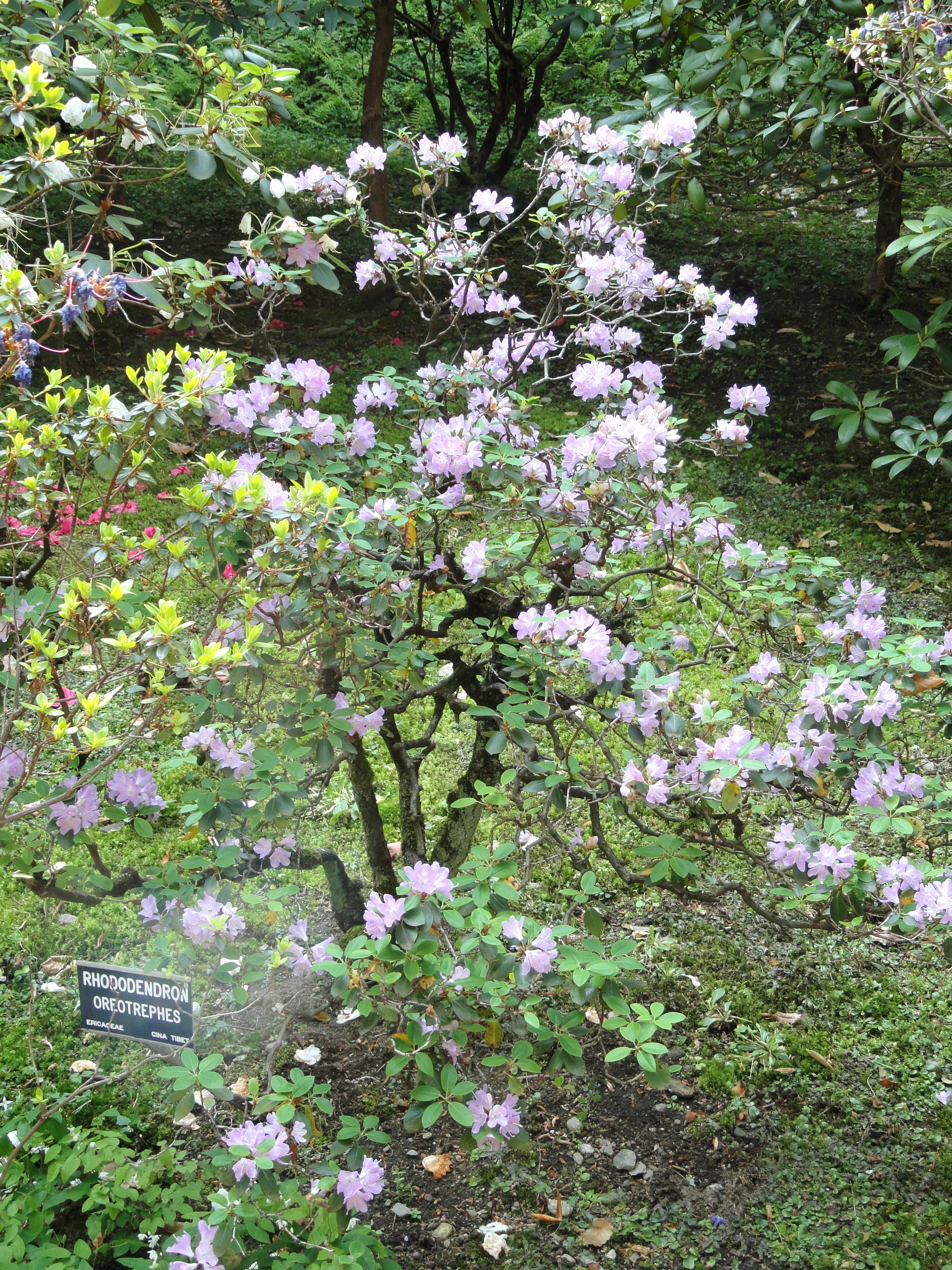

Scientific classification
- Kingdom: Plantae
- Clade: Embryophytes
- Clade: Tracheophytes
- Clade: Angiosperms
- Clade: Eudicots
- Clade: Asterids
- Order: Ericales
- Family: Ericaceae
- Genus: Rhododendron
- Subgenus: Rhododendron subg. Rhododendron
- Section: Rhododendron sect. Rhododendron
- Species: R. oreotrephes

Binomial name
- Rhododendron oreotrephes W.W.Sm.

= Rhododendron oreotrephes =

Species of plant

Rhododendron oreotrephes (山育杜鹃, shan yu du juan) is rhododendron species native to Burma and south-west China, collected in Sichuan in 1904 by Dr. Ernest Henry Wilson. It is an upright shrub, growing to 4 metres (13 ft) in height, with oblong, often bluish, leaves up to 6 centimetres (2.4 in) in length. Its flowers are pink to lavender. Fragrant leaves smell of warming spices with notes of cinnamon and pine.
