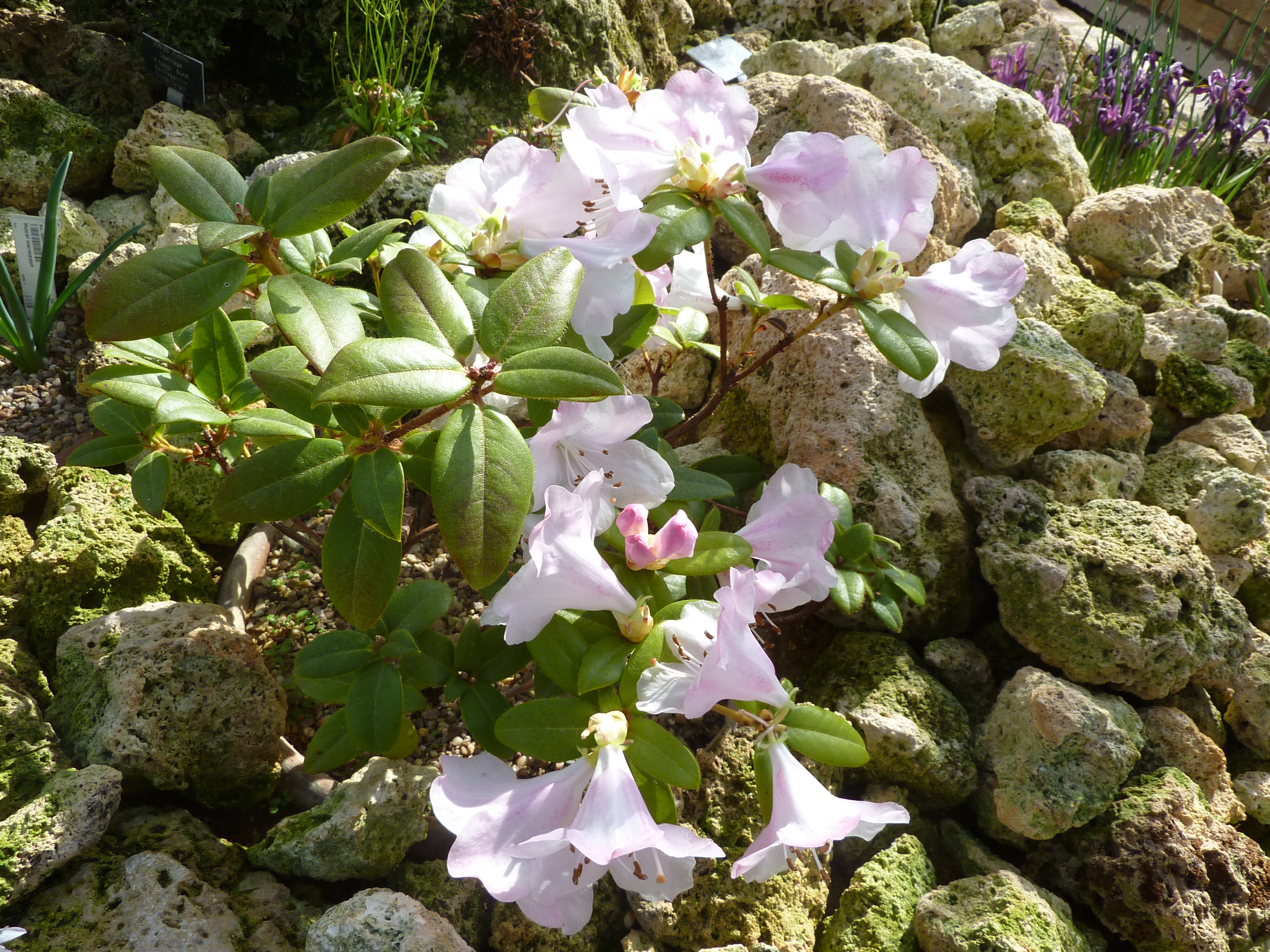

Scientific classification
- Kingdom: Plantae
- Clade: Tracheophytes
- Clade: Angiosperms
- Clade: Eudicots
- Clade: Asterids
- Order: Ericales
- Family: Ericaceae
- Genus: Rhododendron
- Species: R. ciliatum

Binomial name
- Rhododendron ciliatum Hook.f.

= Rhododendron ciliatum =

Species of flowering bush

Rhododendron ciliatum (睫毛杜鹃) is a rhododendron species that is native to eastern Nepal, Sikkim, Bhutan, southern Tibet, and Xizang in China.

It grows at altitudes of 2,700–3,500 m (8,900–11,500 ft). It is a shrub that can grow up to 30–200 cm (12–79 in) in height, with leathery leaves that are elliptic or oblong-elliptic to oblong-lanceolate, 3–8 by 1.6–3.7 cm in size. Its flowers are white tinged with pink.
