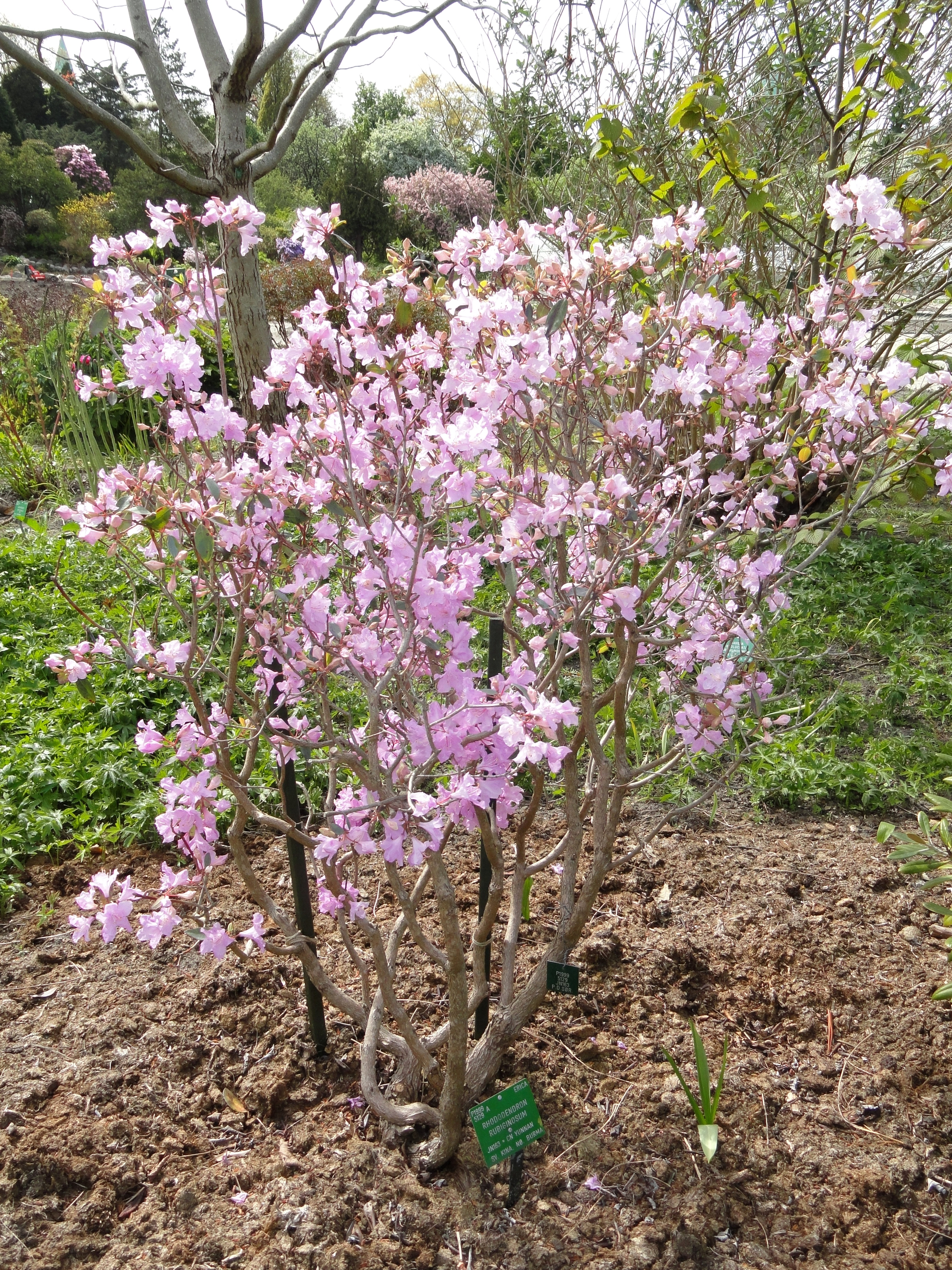

Scientific classification
- Kingdom: Plantae
- Clade: Tracheophytes
- Clade: Angiosperms
- Clade: Eudicots
- Clade: Asterids
- Order: Ericales
- Family: Ericaceae
- Genus: Rhododendron
- Species: R. rubiginosum

Binomial name
- Rhododendron rubiginosum Franch.

= Rhododendron rubiginosum =

Species of plant

Rhododendron rubiginosum (红棕杜鹃) is a rhododendron species native to Myanmar, and Sichuan, Tibet, and Yunnan in China, where it grows at altitudes of 2,800–3,600 m (9,200–11,800 ft). This evergreen shrub grows to 1–3 m (3.3–9.8 ft) in height, with leaves that are elliptic or elliptic-lanceolate or oblong-ovate, 3.5–8 by 1.3–3.5 cm in size. The flowers are pink, red, or pale purple.

== Synonyms ==
- Rhododendron catapastum Balf.f. & Forrest
- Rhododendron leclerei H.Lév.
- Rhododendron leprosum Balf.f.
- Rhododendron squarrosum Balf.f.
- Rhododendron stenoplastum Balf.f. & Forrest
