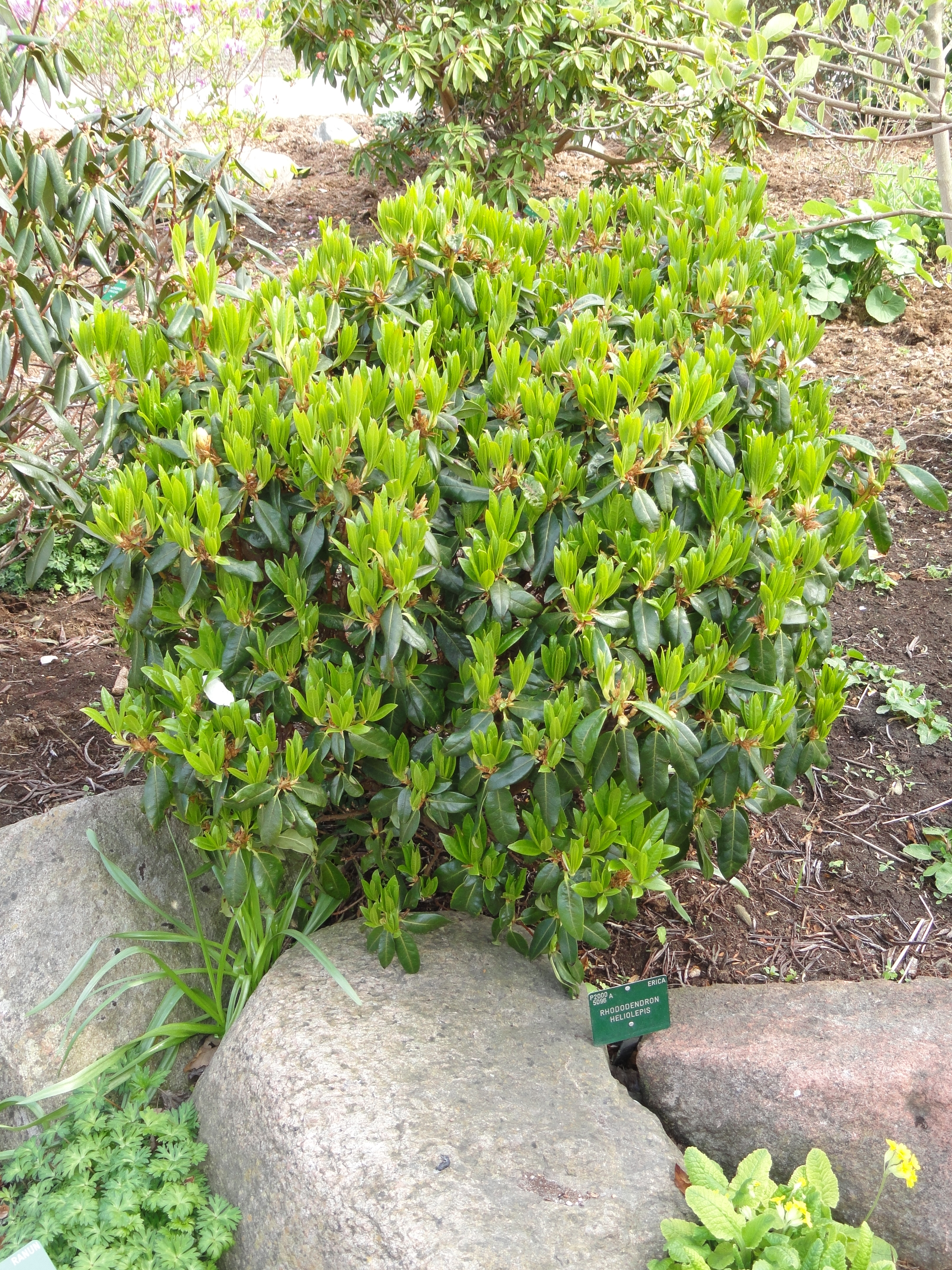

Scientific classification
- Kingdom: Plantae
- Clade: Tracheophytes
- Clade: Angiosperms
- Clade: Eudicots
- Clade: Asterids
- Order: Ericales
- Family: Ericaceae
- Genus: Rhododendron
- Species: R. heliolepis

Binomial name
- Rhododendron heliolepis Franch.

= Rhododendron heliolepis =

Species of plant

Rhododendron heliolepis (亮鳞杜鹃) is a rhododendron species native to Myanmar, and Sichuan, Xizang, and Yunnan in China, where it grows at altitudes of 3,000–3,700 m (9,800–12,100 ft). It is an evergreen shrub that grows to 2–5 m (6.6–16.4 ft) in height, with leaves that are elliptic or elliptic-lanceolate, 5–12 by 1.7–4 cm in size. The flowers are pink, pale purple-red, or rarely white, with purple or brown spots inside.
