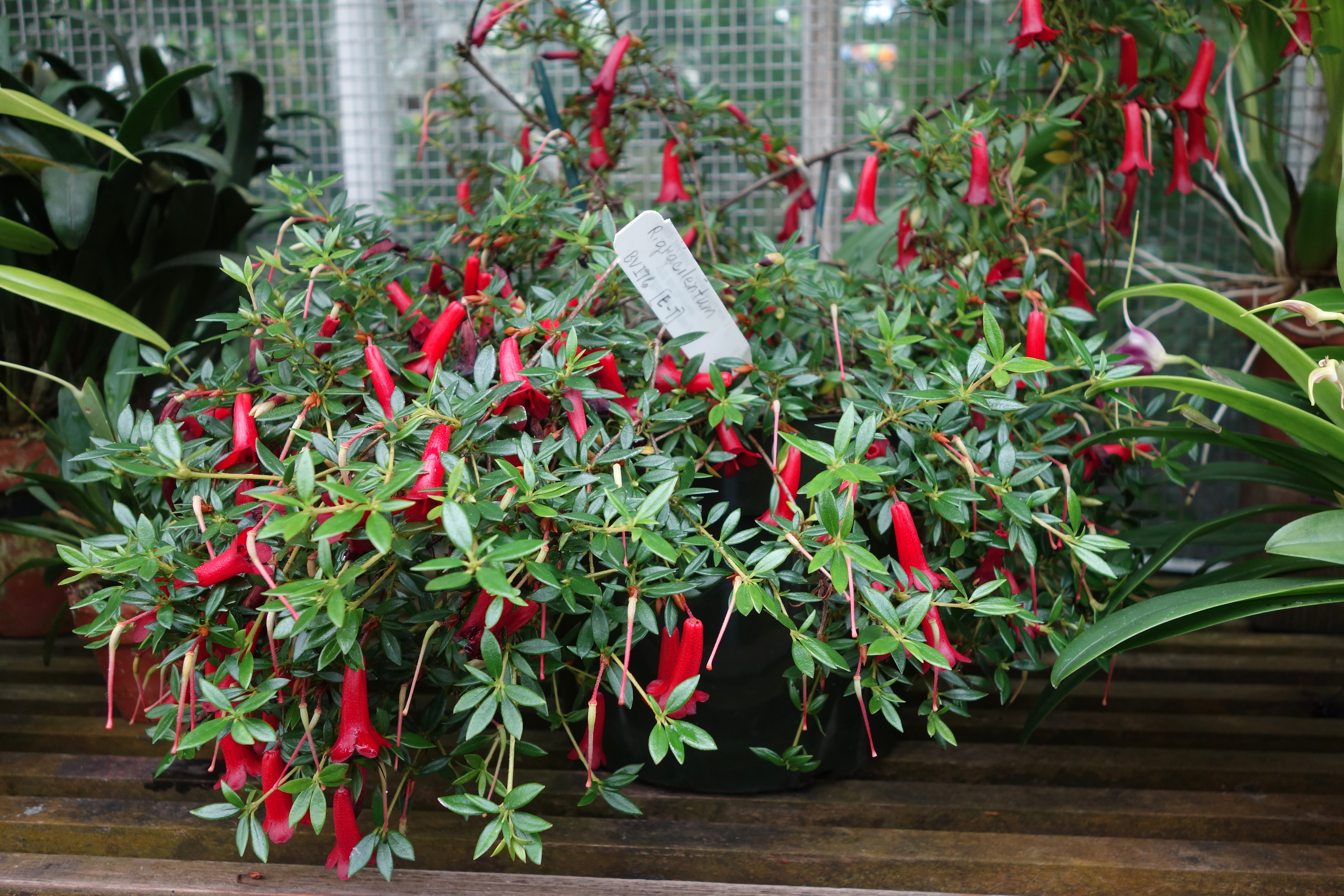

Scientific classification
- Kingdom: Plantae
- Clade: Tracheophytes
- Clade: Angiosperms
- Clade: Eudicots
- Clade: Asterids
- Order: Ericales
- Family: Ericaceae
- Genus: Rhododendron
- Species: R. gracilentum

Binomial name
- Rhododendron gracilentum F.Muell.

= Rhododendron gracilentum =

Species of plant

Rhododendron gracilentum is a distinctive small, evergreen rhododendron species native to Papua New Guinea. It grows to a height of 60 cm (24 in), with red flowers.

As it does not tolerate freezing temperatures, in temperate zones it must be grown with the protection of glass.
