= Rhododendron primuliflorum =

Scientific classification
- Kingdom: Plantae
- Clade: Embryophytes
- Clade: Tracheophytes
- Clade: Spermatophytes
- Clade: Angiosperms
- Clade: Eudicots
- Clade: Asterids
- Order: Ericales
- Family: Ericaceae
- Genus: Rhododendron
- Species: R. primuliflorum

Binomial name
- Rhododendron primuliflorum Bureau & Franch.

Synonyms
- List: Rhododendron acraium Balf.f. & W.W.Sm.; Rhododendron clivicola Balf.f. & W.W.Sm.; Rhododendron cremnophilum Balf.f. & W.W.Sm.; Rhododendron gymnomiscum Balf.f. & Kingdon-Ward; Rhododendron praeclarum Balf.f. & Farrer; Rhododendron tsarongense Balf.f. & Forrest

Species of flowering plant

Rhododendron primuliflorum is a species of flowering plant in the genus Rhododendron native to central China. It has gained the Royal Horticultural Society's Award of Garden Merit.
