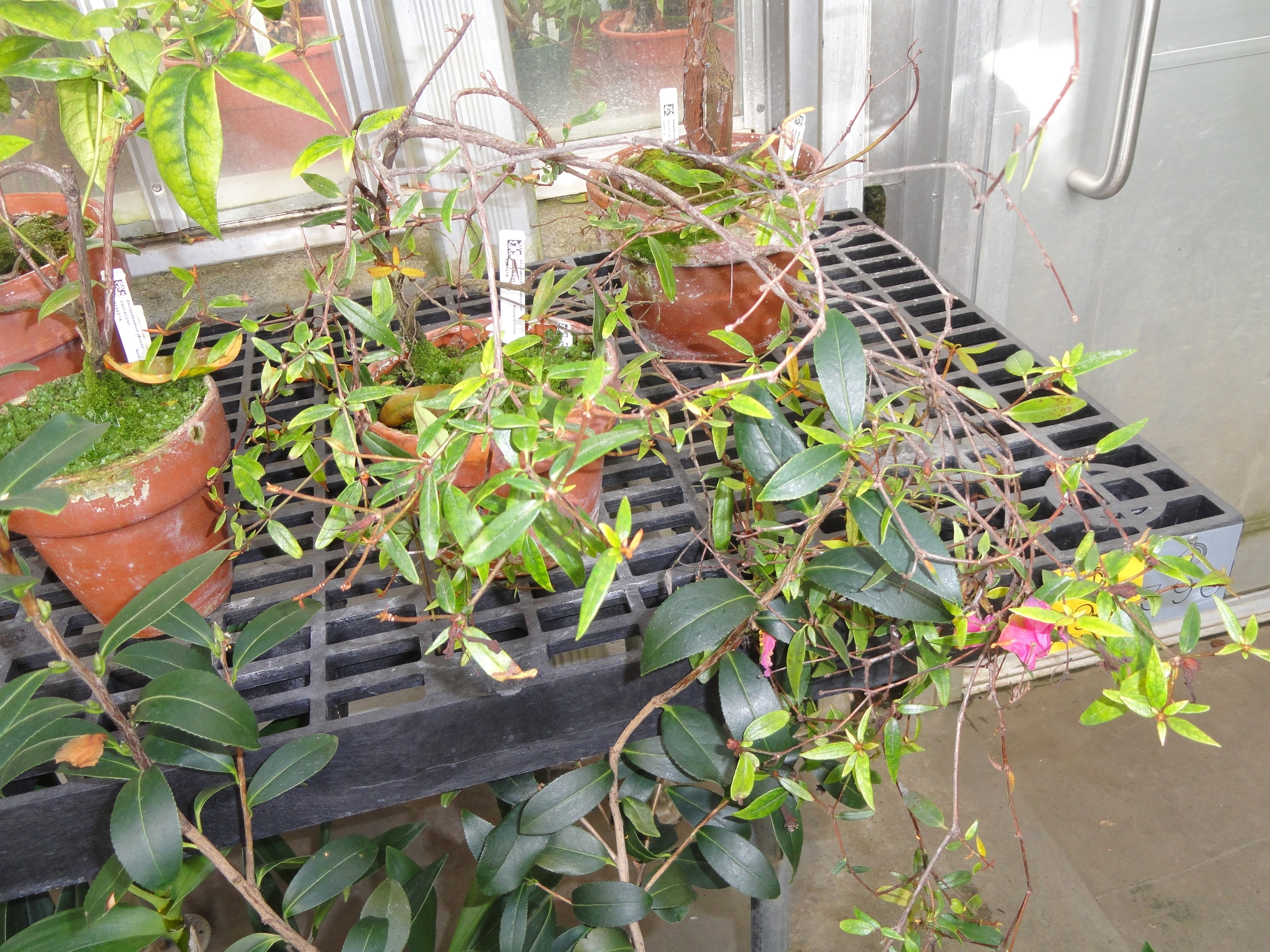

Scientific classification
- Kingdom: Plantae
- Clade: Embryophytes
- Clade: Tracheophytes
- Clade: Angiosperms
- Clade: Eudicots
- Clade: Asterids
- Order: Ericales
- Family: Ericaceae
- Genus: Rhododendron
- Species: R. cuneatum

Binomial name
- Rhododendron cuneatum W.W.Sm.

Synonyms
- Rhododendron calcicolum; Rhododendron cheilanthum; Rhododendron cinereum; Rhododendron habaense; Rhododendron ravum; Rhododendron sclerocladum

= Rhododendron cuneatum =

Species of plant

Rhododendron cuneatum (楔叶杜鹃) is a rhododendron species native to northern and western Yunnan and southwestern Sichuan in China, where it grows at altitudes of 2,700–4,300 m (8,900–14,100 ft). It is an erect evergreen shrub that grows 1.2–1.8 m (4–6 ft) in height, with leaves that are narrowly to broadly elliptic or oblong-lanceolate, 1–7 × 0.5–2.8 cm in size. The flowers are usually a deep rose colour.
