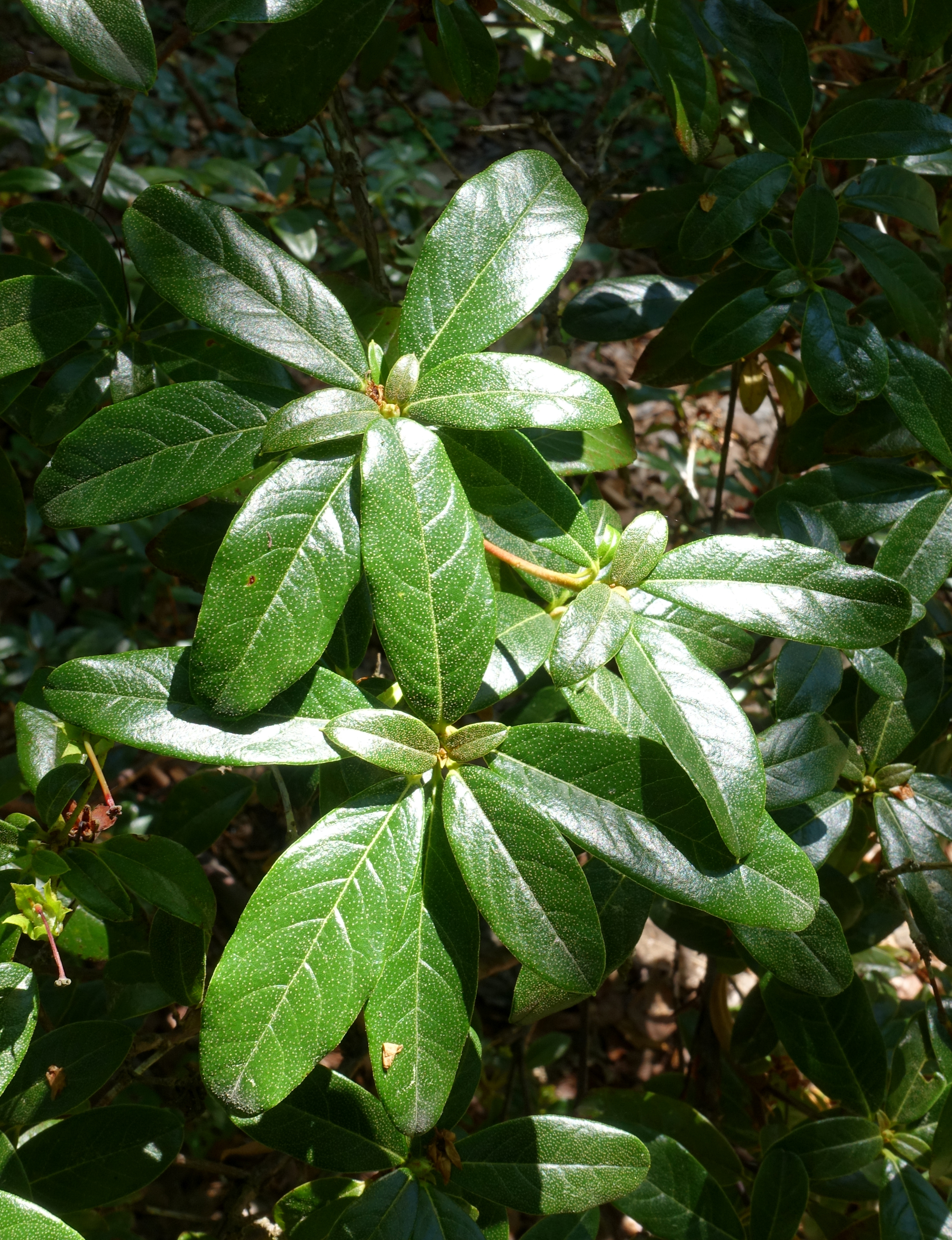

Scientific classification
- Kingdom: Plantae
- Clade: Tracheophytes
- Clade: Angiosperms
- Clade: Eudicots
- Clade: Asterids
- Order: Ericales
- Family: Ericaceae
- Genus: Rhododendron
- Species: R. charitopes

Binomial name
- Rhododendron charitopes Balf.f. & Farrer

Synonyms
- Rhododendron charitopes subsp. charitopes

= Rhododendron charitopes =

Species of plant

Rhododendron charitopes (雅容杜鹃) is a species of flowering plant in the family Ericaceae. It is native to southeast Xizang and northwest Yunnan, China, where it grows at altitudes of 2,500–4,300 m (8,200–14,100 ft). It is a dwarf evergreen shrub that typically grows to 25–90 cm (9.8–35.4 in) in height, with aromatic, leathery leaves that are obovate to obovate-elliptic in shape, and 2.6–7 × 1.3–4.5 cm in size. The flowers are whitish pink to rose or purple.

== Sources ==
- I. B. Balfour & Farrer, Notes Roy. Bot. Gard. Edinburgh. 13: 243. 1922.
