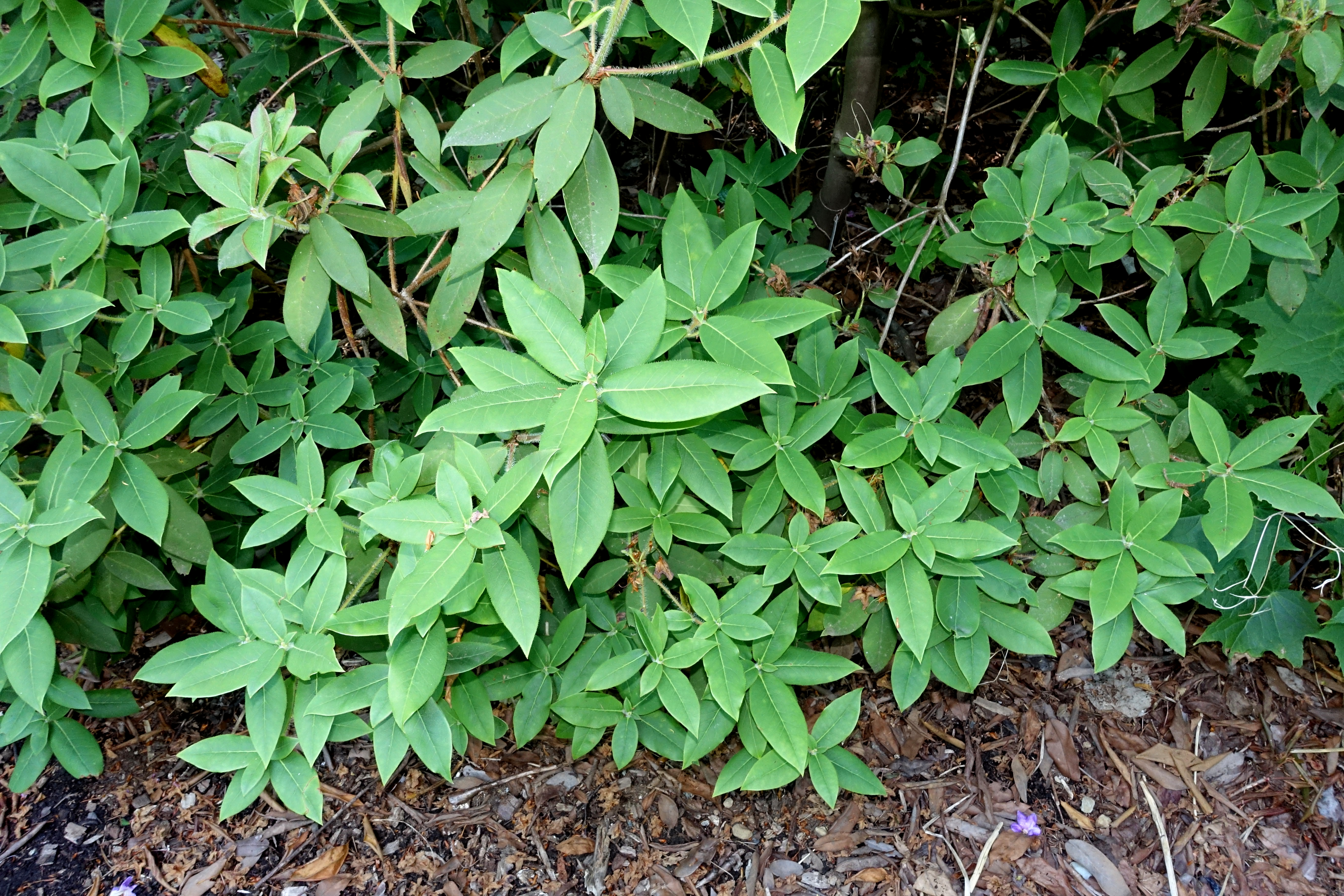

Scientific classification
- Kingdom: Plantae
- Clade: Tracheophytes
- Clade: Angiosperms
- Clade: Eudicots
- Clade: Asterids
- Order: Ericales
- Family: Ericaceae
- Genus: Rhododendron
- Species: R. trichanthum

Binomial name
- Rhododendron trichanthum Rehder (1945)

Synonyms
- Rhododendron villosum Hemsl. & E.H.Wilson (1910), nom. illeg.

= Rhododendron trichanthum =

Species of plant

Rhododendron trichanthum (长毛杜鹃) is a rhododendron species native to western Sichuan, China, where it grows at elevations of 1,600–3,700 m (5,200–12,100 ft). It is an evergreen shrub that typically grows to 1–3 m (3.3–9.8 ft) in height, with leaves that are oblong-lanceolate and ovate-lanceolate, and 4–11 × 1.5–3.5 cm in size. The flowers are pale purple, rose red, or white.
