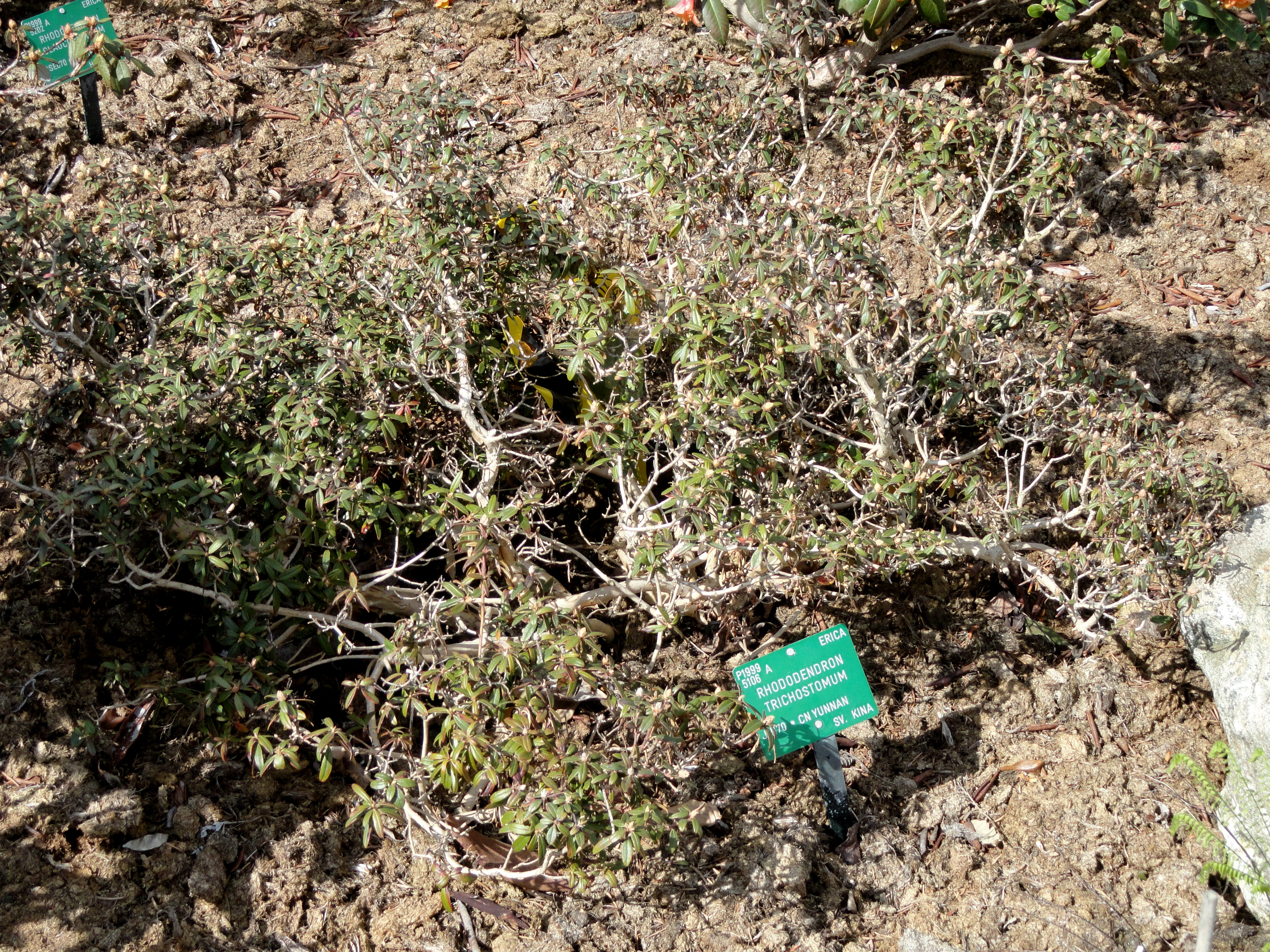

Scientific classification
- Kingdom: Plantae
- Clade: Tracheophytes
- Clade: Angiosperms
- Clade: Eudicots
- Clade: Asterids
- Order: Ericales
- Family: Ericaceae
- Genus: Rhododendron
- Species: R. trichostomum

Binomial name
- Rhododendron trichostomum Franch.

= Rhododendron trichostomum =

Species of plant

Rhododendron trichostomum (毛嘴杜鹃) is a rhododendron species native to southwestern China, where it grows at altitudes of 2,700–4,600 m (8,900–15,100 ft). It is an evergreen shrub that grows to 30–100 cm (12–39 in) in height, with leaves that are linear, linear-lanceolate, oblong, or oblanceolate, 0.8–3.2 by 0.3–0.5 cm in size. The flowers are pink or white.

== Synonyms ==
- Rhododendron fragrans Franch.
- Rhododendron ledoides Balf.f. & W.W.Sm.
- Rhododendron sphaeranthum Balf.f. & W.W.Sm.
