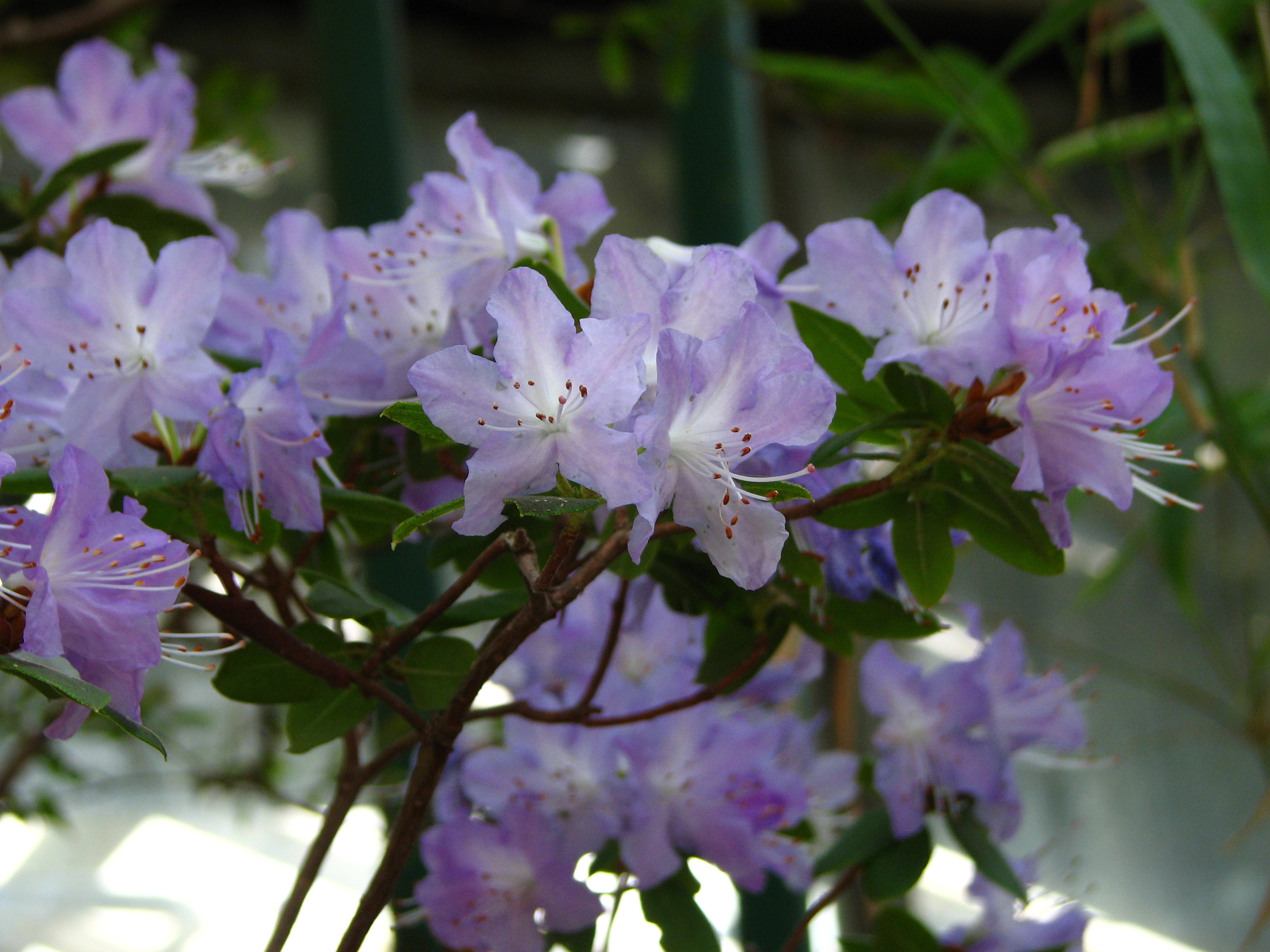

Scientific classification
- Kingdom: Plantae
- Clade: Embryophytes
- Clade: Tracheophytes
- Clade: Spermatophytes
- Clade: Angiosperms
- Clade: Eudicots
- Clade: Asterids
- Order: Ericales
- Family: Ericaceae
- Genus: Rhododendron
- Species: R. augustinii

Binomial name
- Rhododendron augustinii Hemsl.

Synonyms
- List: Azalea augustinii (Hemsl.) Kuntze; Rhododendron vilmorinianum Balf.f.

= Rhododendron augustinii =

Species of flowering plant

Rhododendron augustinii, called the blue rhododendron or Augustine's rhododendron, is a species of flowering plant in the genus Rhododendron native to central China and Tibet. Its Electra Group has gained the Royal Horticultural Society's Award of Garden Merit.

== Subspecies ==
The following subspecies are currently accepted:

- Rhododendron augustinii subsp. chasmanthum (Diels) Cullen
