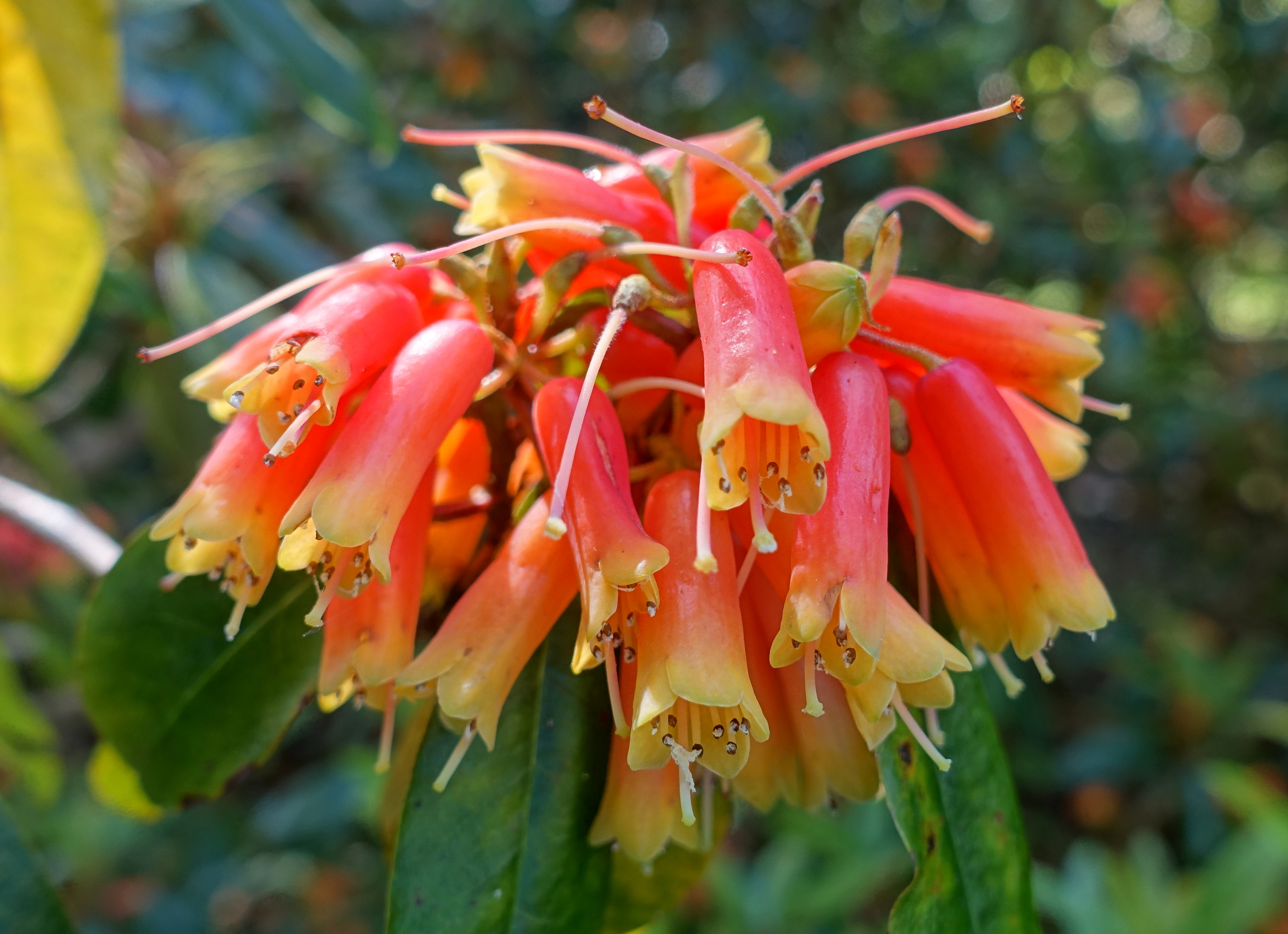

Scientific classification
- Kingdom: Plantae
- Clade: Tracheophytes
- Clade: Angiosperms
- Clade: Eudicots
- Clade: Asterids
- Order: Ericales
- Family: Ericaceae
- Genus: Rhododendron
- Species: R. keysii

Binomial name
- Rhododendron keysii Nutt.

Synonyms
- Rhododendron keysii var. unicolor Hutch.

= Rhododendron keysii =

Species of plant

Rhododendron keysii (管花杜鹃) is a rhododendron species native to northeastern India, Bhutan, Sikkim, and southern Tibet, where it grows at altitudes of 2,400–4,300 m (7,900–14,100 ft). It is an evergreen shrub that typically grows to 1–4 m (3.3–13.1 ft) in height, with leathery leaves that are lanceolate-elliptic or lanceolate-oblong in shape, and typically 4–8 × 1–3 cm in size. The flowers are orange or salmon pink to deep red.
