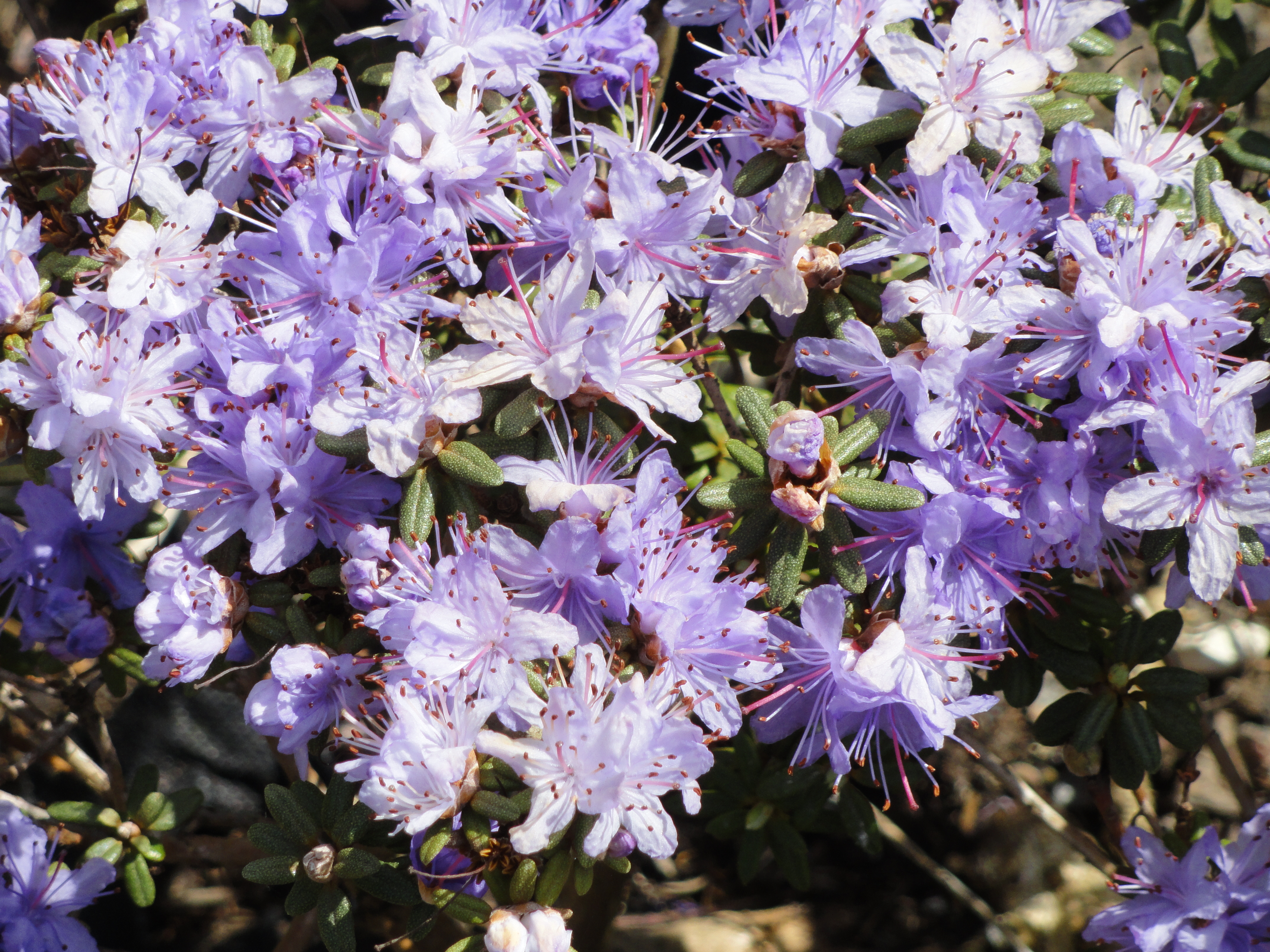

Scientific classification
- Kingdom: Plantae
- Clade: Tracheophytes
- Clade: Angiosperms
- Clade: Eudicots
- Clade: Asterids
- Order: Ericales
- Family: Ericaceae
- Genus: Rhododendron
- Species: R. impeditum

Binomial name
- Rhododendron impeditum Balf.f. & W.W.Sm.

Synonyms
- Rhododendron litangense Balf.f.

= Rhododendron impeditum =

Species of plant

Rhododendron impeditum (粉紫杜鹃), the dwarf purple rhododendron, is a species of flowering plant in the family Ericaceae, native to southwestern Sichuan and northwest Yunnan in China, where it grows at altitudes of 2,500–4,600 m (8,200–15,100 ft). This compact evergreen shrub grows to 60 cm (24 in) tall and broad. The leaves are ovate, elliptic or broadly elliptic to oblong, 0.5–1.4 by 0.3–0.6 cm in size. The flowers are purple, violet, or rose-lavender, or rarely white.
