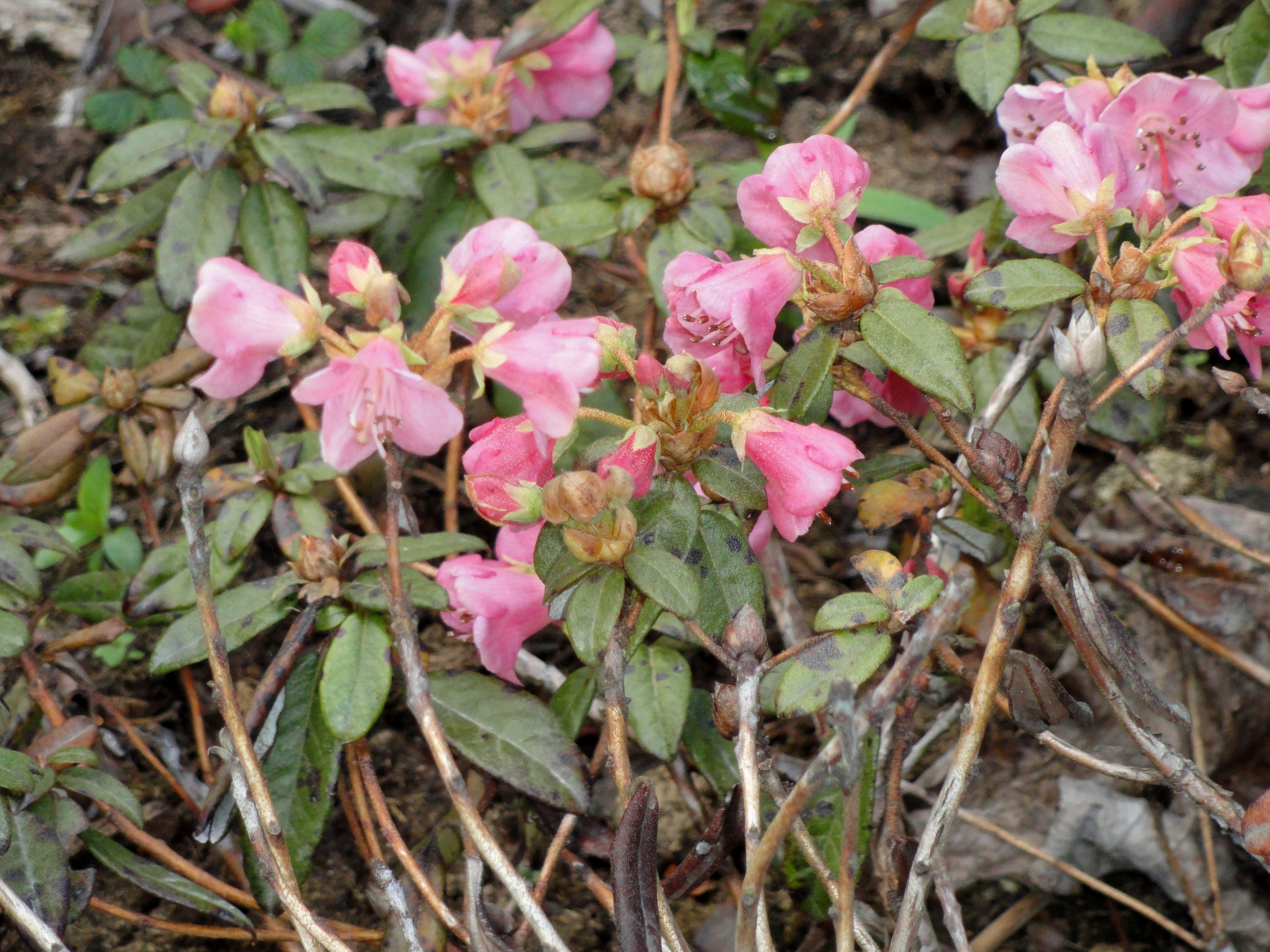

Scientific classification
- Kingdom: Plantae
- Clade: Tracheophytes
- Clade: Angiosperms
- Clade: Eudicots
- Clade: Asterids
- Order: Ericales
- Family: Ericaceae
- Genus: Rhododendron
- Species: R. glaucophyllum

Binomial name
- Rhododendron glaucophyllum Rehder

Synonyms
- Azalea glauca Kuntze

= Rhododendron glaucophyllum =

Species of plant

Rhododendron glaucophyllum is a rhododendron species native to eastern Nepal, India, Bhutan, and southern Tibet, where it grows at altitudes of 2,700–3,700 m (8,900–12,100 ft). It is a compact evergreen shrub that grows to 1.5 m (4.9 ft) in height, and is somewhat broader than it is high. The flowers are predominantly pink.
