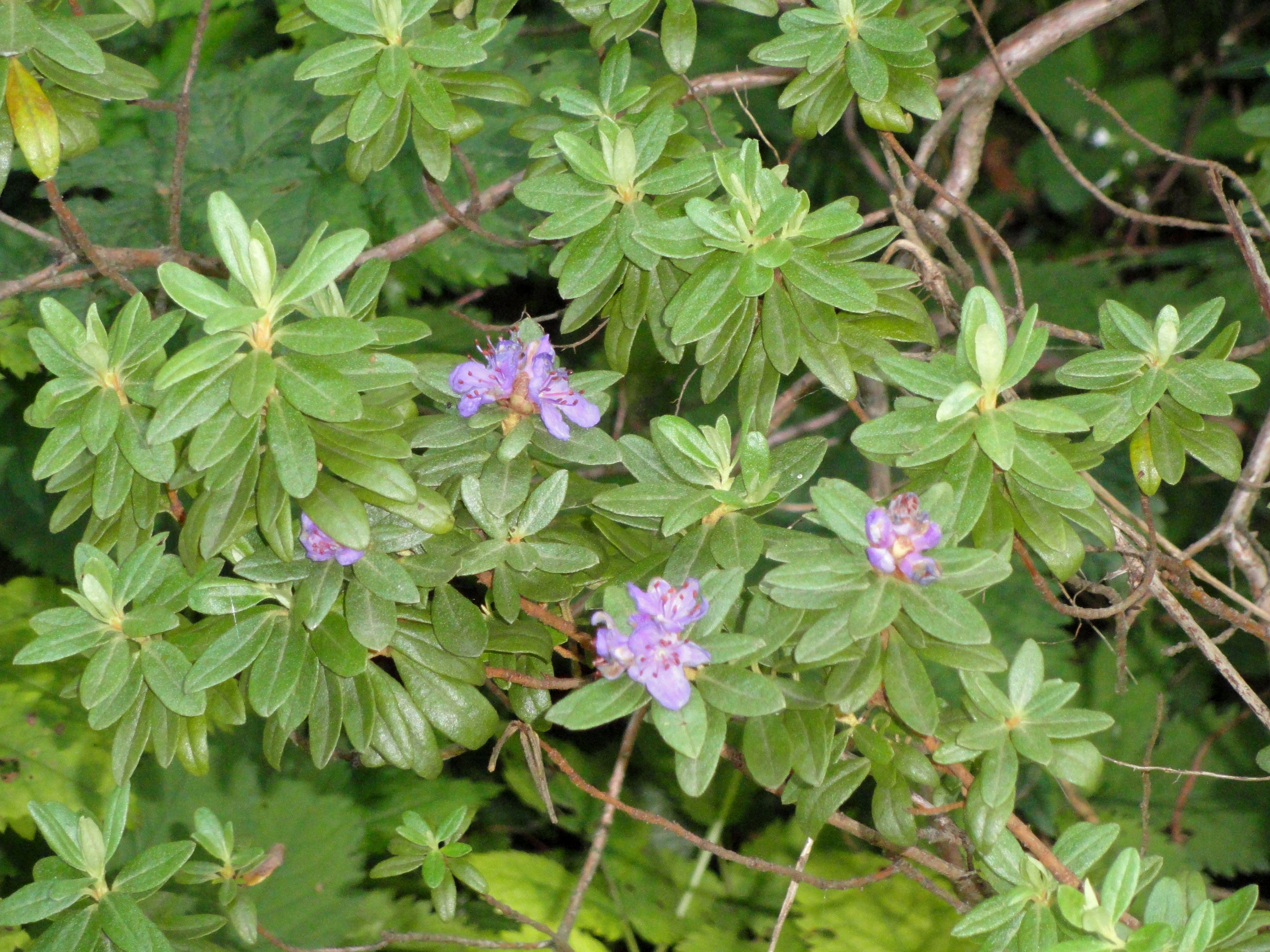

Scientific classification
- Kingdom: Plantae
- Clade: Tracheophytes
- Clade: Angiosperms
- Clade: Eudicots
- Clade: Asterids
- Order: Ericales
- Family: Ericaceae
- Genus: Rhododendron
- Species: R. hippophaeoides

Binomial name
- Rhododendron hippophaeoides Balf.f. & W.W.Sm.

= Rhododendron hippophaeoides =

Species of plant

Rhododendron hippophaeoides (灰背杜鹃) is a species of flowering plant in the family Ericaceae. It is in the subgenus Rhododendron (scaly or lepidote rhododendrons), subsection Lapponica. It is a small shrub, up to 4 feet (1.2 m) tall at maturity, native to altitudes of 2,400–4,800 m (7,900–15,700 ft) in southwest Sichuan and many parts of Yunnan, China. The leaves are up to 1.5 in (3.8 cm) long, gray-green above, and with overlapping yellowish-buff scales below. The flowers are bright rose or lavender-blue to bluish purple, or (rarely) white.

== Sources ==
- I. B. Balfour & W. W. Smith, Notes Roy. Bot. Gard. Edinburgh 9(44-45): 236-237 236 1916.
- Cullen, J. 1980. "A revision of Rhododendron. I. Subgenus Rhododendron sections Rhododendron & Pogonanthum", Notes Roy. Bot. Gard. Edinburgh, 39:96–97.
