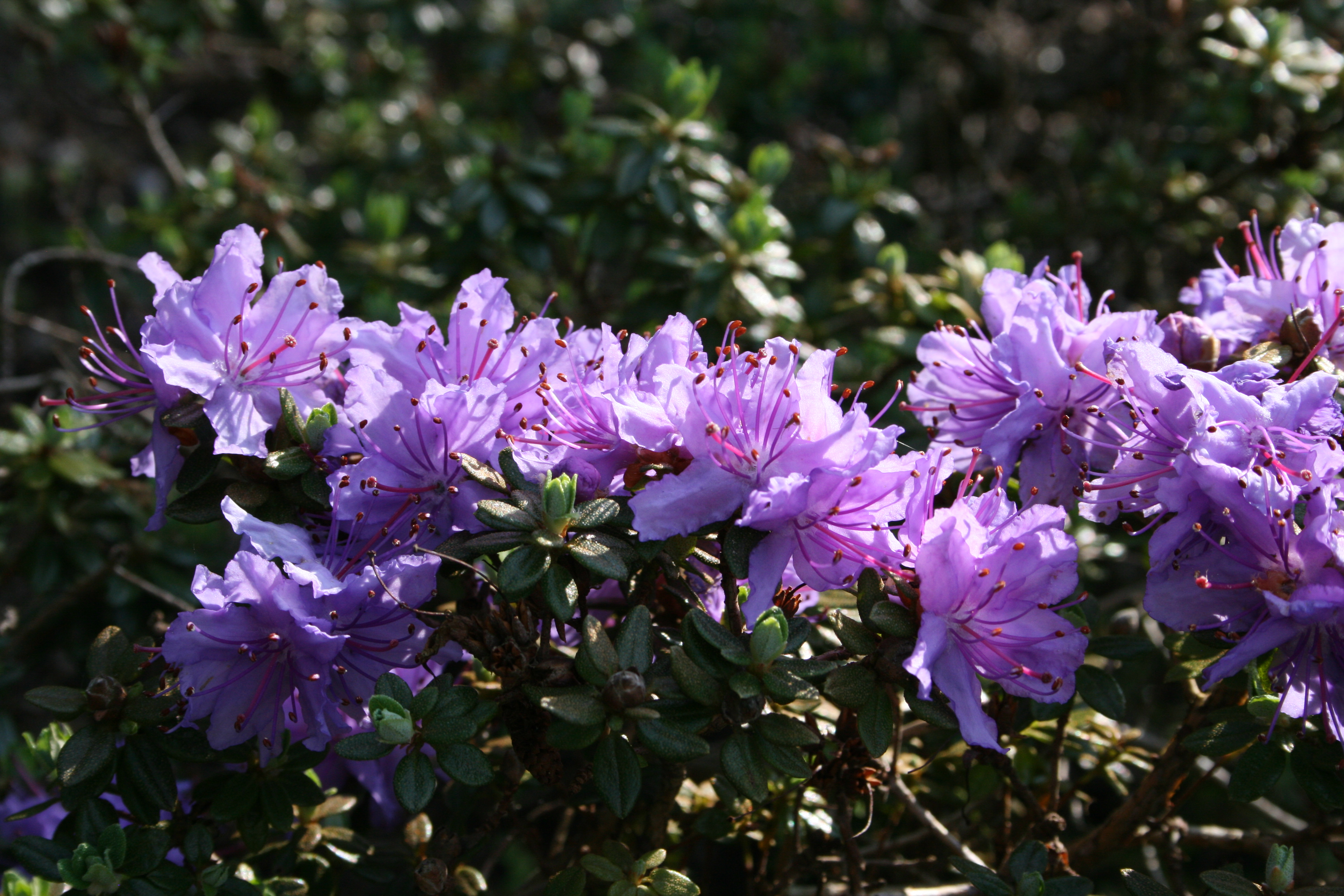

Scientific classification
- Kingdom: Plantae
- Clade: Tracheophytes
- Clade: Angiosperms
- Clade: Eudicots
- Clade: Asterids
- Order: Ericales
- Family: Ericaceae
- Genus: Rhododendron
- Subgenus: Rhododendron subg. Rhododendron
- Section: Rhododendron sect. Rhododendron
- Subsection: Rhododendron subsect. Lapponica
- Species: R. fastigiatum

Binomial name
- Rhododendron fastigiatum Franch.

= Rhododendron fastigiatum =

Species of plant

Rhododendron fastigiatum is a dwarf lepidote rhododendron species with purple flowers native to Yunnan, China. Cultivars include 'Best Dark Purple'.

== Bibliography ==
- The Plant List: Rhododendron fastigiatum
- Hirsutum: Rhododendron fastigiatum
