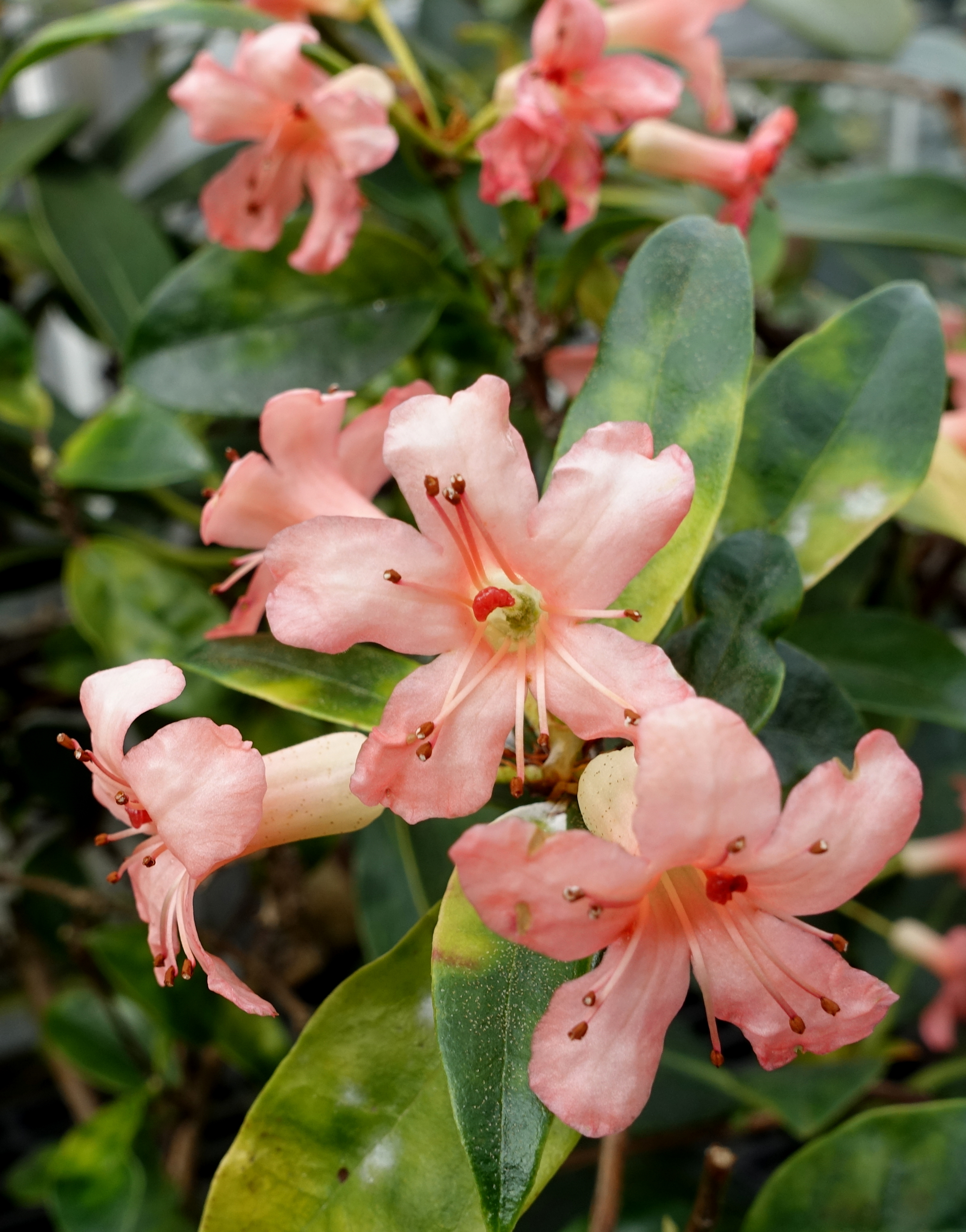

Scientific classification
- Kingdom: Plantae
- Clade: Tracheophytes
- Clade: Angiosperms
- Clade: Eudicots
- Clade: Asterids
- Order: Ericales
- Family: Ericaceae
- Genus: Rhododendron
- Species: R. rarilepidotum

Binomial name
- Rhododendron rarilepidotum J.J.Sm.

= Rhododendron rarilepidotum =

Species of plant

Rhododendron rarilepidotum is a rhododendron species native to Sumatra, where it grows at altitudes of 1,000–2,500 m (3,300–8,200 ft). It is an evergreen shrub that grows to 4 m (13 ft) in height, with elliptic leaves that are 9 × 3.5 cm in size. The flowers are orange or yellow, and broadly funnel-shaped.
