= Rhododendron rousei =

Scientific classification
- Kingdom: Plantae
- Clade: Tracheophytes
- Clade: Angiosperms
- Clade: Eudicots
- Clade: Asterids
- Order: Ericales
- Family: Ericaceae
- Genus: Rhododendron
- Species: R. rousei

Binomial name
- Rhododendron rousei Argent & Madulid

Species of plant

Rhododendron rousei is a species of Rhododendron native to the Philippines.
