= Rhododendron viridescens =

Scientific classification
- Kingdom: Plantae
- Clade: Tracheophytes
- Clade: Angiosperms
- Clade: Eudicots
- Clade: Asterids
- Order: Ericales
- Family: Ericaceae
- Genus: Rhododendron
- Species: R. viridescens

Binomial name
- Rhododendron viridescens Hutch.

Species of plant

Rhododendron viridescens is a species of flowering plant in the family Ericaceae. It is native to south-southeast Tibet. A shrub or subshrub, there is a cultivar, 'Doshong La', available from commercial suppliers.
