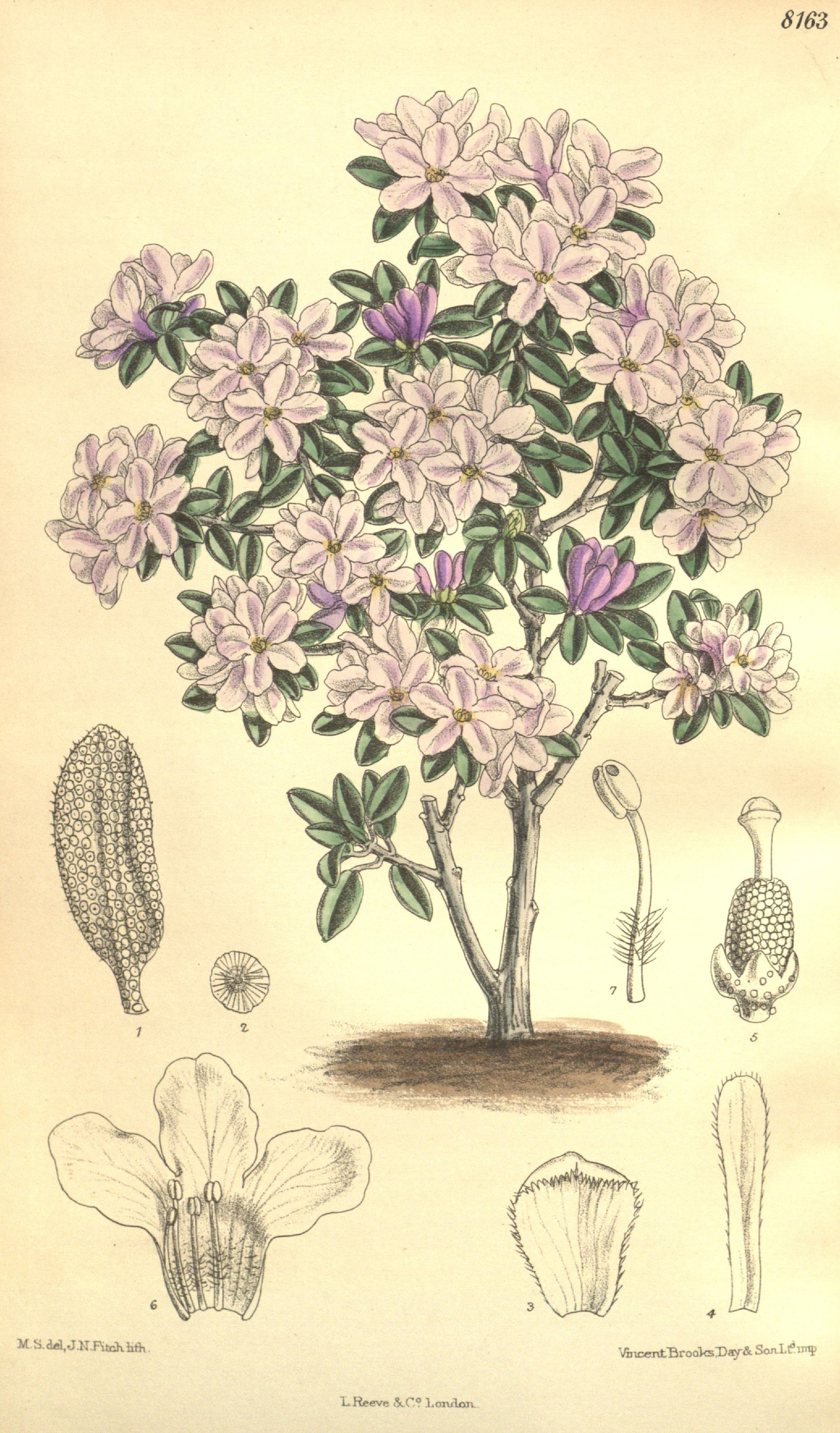
- Illustration, Curtis's botanical magazine

Scientific classification
- Kingdom: Plantae
- Clade: Tracheophytes
- Clade: Angiosperms
- Clade: Eudicots
- Clade: Asterids
- Order: Ericales
- Family: Ericaceae
- Genus: Rhododendron
- Species: R. intricatum

Binomial name
- Rhododendron intricatum Franch.

Synonyms
- Rhododendron blepharocalyx Franch.; Rhododendron peramabile Hutch.

= Rhododendron intricatum =

Species of plant

Rhododendron intricatum (隐蕊杜鹃) is a rhododendron species native to central and western Sichuan, as well as northern Yunnan, China, where it grows at altitudes of 3,500–4,500 m (11,500–14,800 ft). It is an evergreen shrub that typically grows to 50–100 cm (20–39 in) in height, with leaves that are oblong-elliptic to ovate, and 0.5–1.2 × 0.3–0.7 cm in size. The flowers are pale lavender, purple-blue to dark blue, or rarely yellowish.

This very compact shrub flowers profusely when it is only a few centimetres tall, and is also hardy, being an alpine plant. It is therefore a suitable subject for a rock garden.
