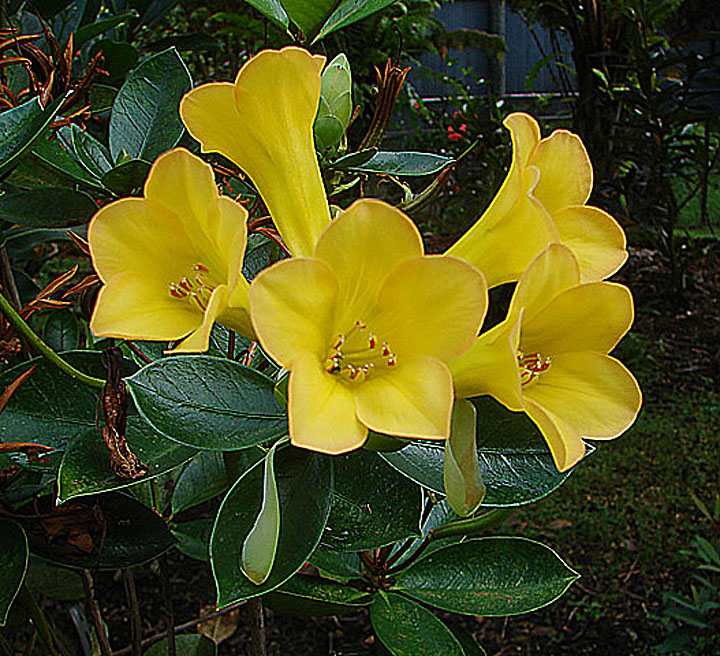

Scientific classification
- Kingdom: Plantae
- Clade: Tracheophytes
- Clade: Angiosperms
- Clade: Eudicots
- Clade: Asterids
- Order: Ericales
- Family: Ericaceae
- Genus: Rhododendron
- Subgenus: Rhododendron subg. Rhododendron
- Section: Rhododendron sect. Vireya
- Species: R. aurigeranum

Binomial name
- Rhododendron aurigeranum Sleumer

= Rhododendron aurigeranum =

Species of plant

Rhododendron aurigeranum is a species of Rhododendron in section Vireya found in Papua New Guinea
