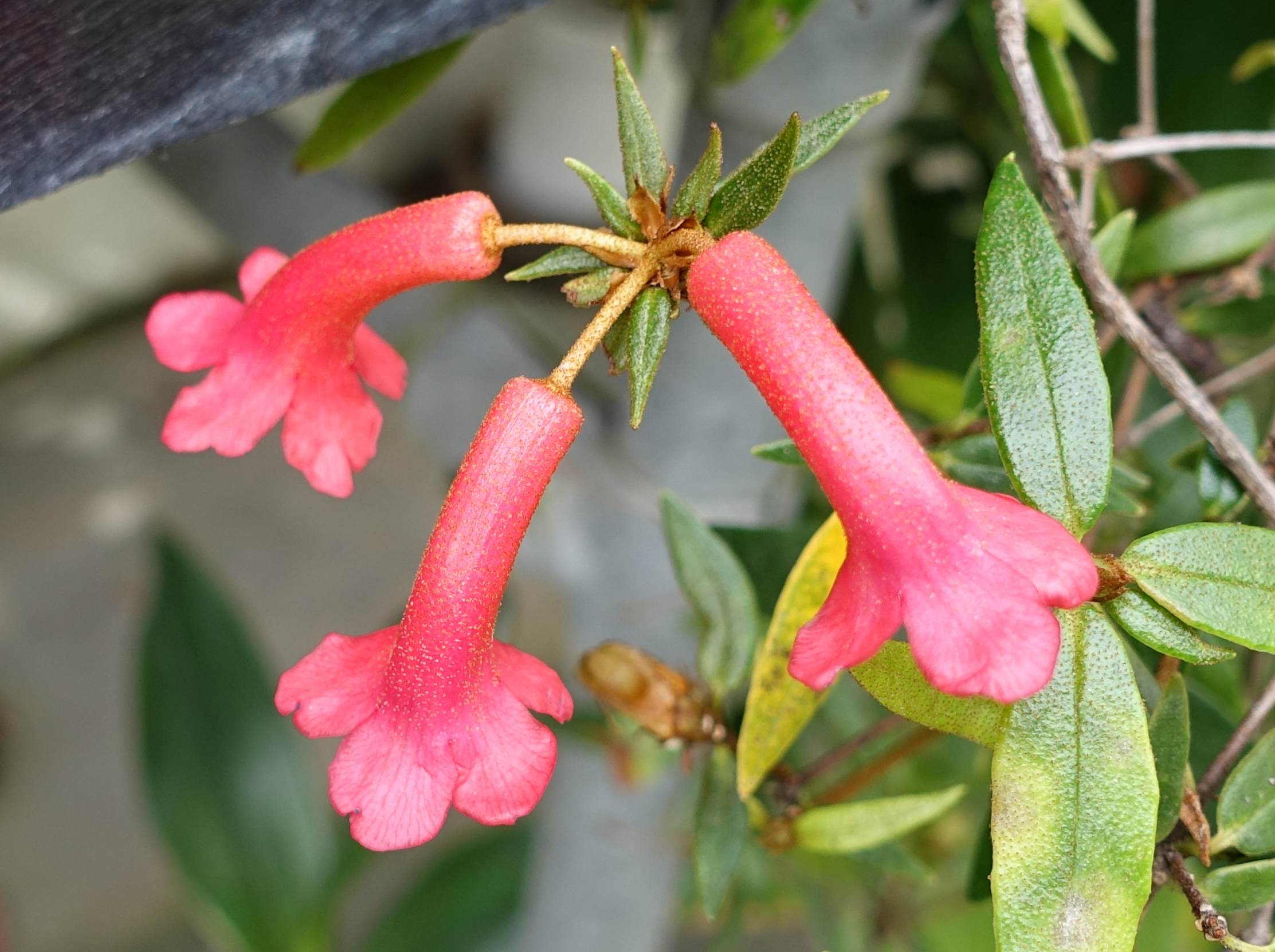

Scientific classification
- Kingdom: Plantae
- Clade: Tracheophytes
- Clade: Angiosperms
- Clade: Eudicots
- Clade: Asterids
- Order: Ericales
- Family: Ericaceae
- Genus: Rhododendron
- Species: R. rarum

Binomial name
- Rhododendron rarum Schltr.

= Rhododendron rarum =

Species of plant

Rhododendron rarum is a rhododendron species native to the Central and Bismarck Ranges of Papua New Guinea.

== Description ==
It is a compact prostrate shrub with tubular, red flowers and narrowly elliptic leaves.

== Habitat ==
This species does not tolerate frosts (RHS Hardiness rating H2), so must be grown under cover in temperate climates. Its small size and prostrate habit make it an ideal subject for a hanging basket or similar.
