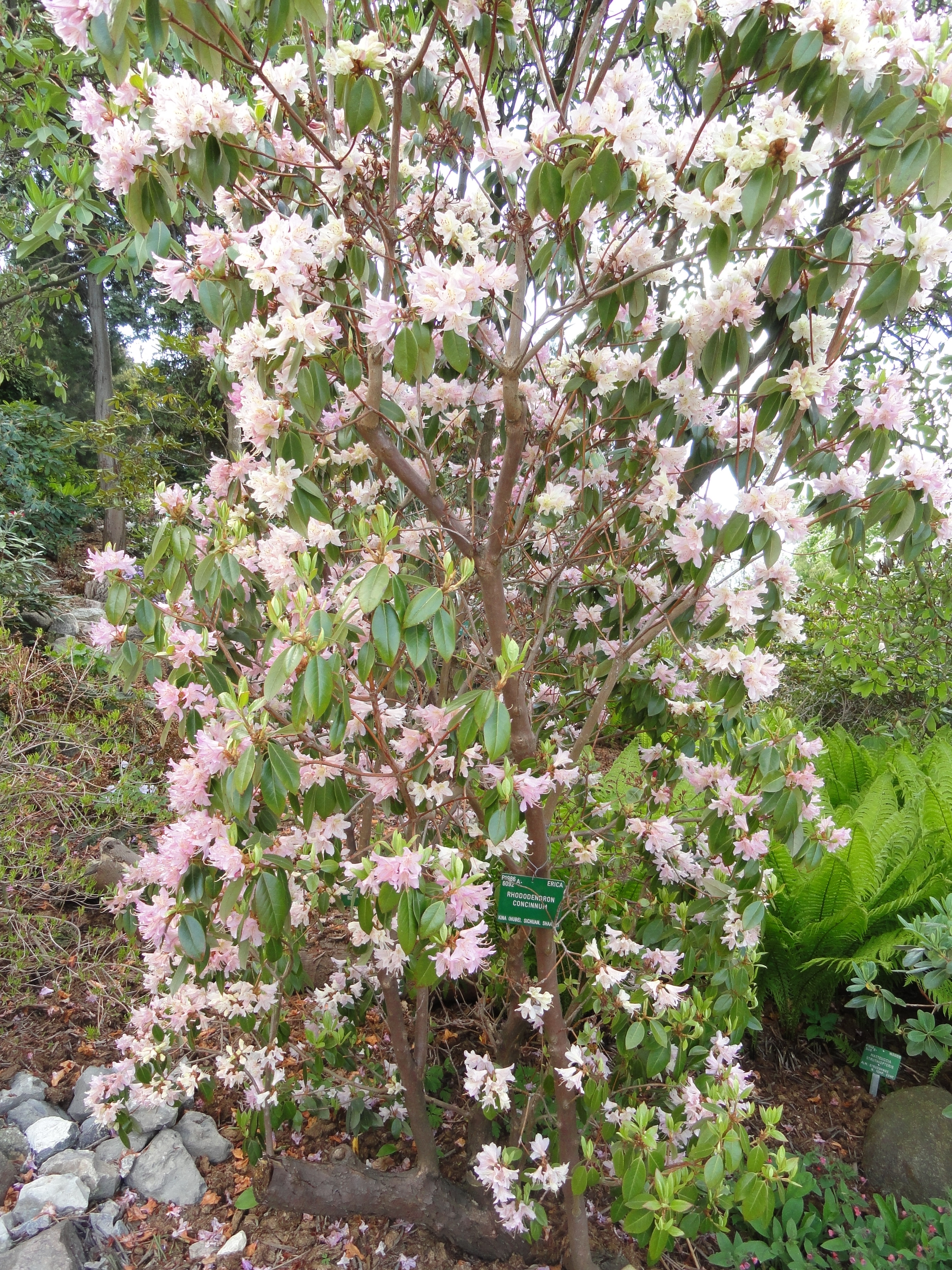

Scientific classification
- Kingdom: Plantae
- Clade: Tracheophytes
- Clade: Angiosperms
- Clade: Eudicots
- Clade: Asterids
- Order: Ericales
- Family: Ericaceae
- Genus: Rhododendron
- Species: R. concinnum

Binomial name
- Rhododendron concinnum Hemsl.

Synonyms
- Rhododendron apiculatum Rehder & E.H. Wilson; Rhododendron atroviride Dunn; Rhododendron benthamianum Hemsl.; Rhododendron concinnum var. benthamianum (Hemsl.) Davidian; Rhododendron concinnum f. laetevirens Cowan; Rhododendron concinnum var. lepidanthum (Rehder & E.H. Wilson) Rehder; Rhododendron concinnum var. pseudoyanthinum (Balf. f. & Hutch.) Davidian; Rhododendron coombense Hemsl.; Rhododendron laetevirens; Rhododendron pseudoyanthinum Balf. f. & Hutch.; Rhododendron subcoombense Balf.f.; Rhododendron yanthinum Bureau & Franch.; Rhododendron yanthinum var. lepidanthum Rehder & E.H. Wilson

= Rhododendron concinnum =

Species of flowering bush

Rhododendron concinnum (秀雅杜鹃) is a species of flowering plant in the family Ericaceae. It is native to Guizhou, Henan, Hubei, Shaanxi, Sichuan, and Yunnan in China, where it grows at altitudes of 2300–3000 meters. It is a shrub that grows to 1.5–3 m in height, with leaves that are oblong, elliptic, ovate, oblong-lanceolate or ovate-lanceolate, 2.5–7.5 by 1.5–3.5 cm in size. Flowers are pale pink to deep purplish red.
