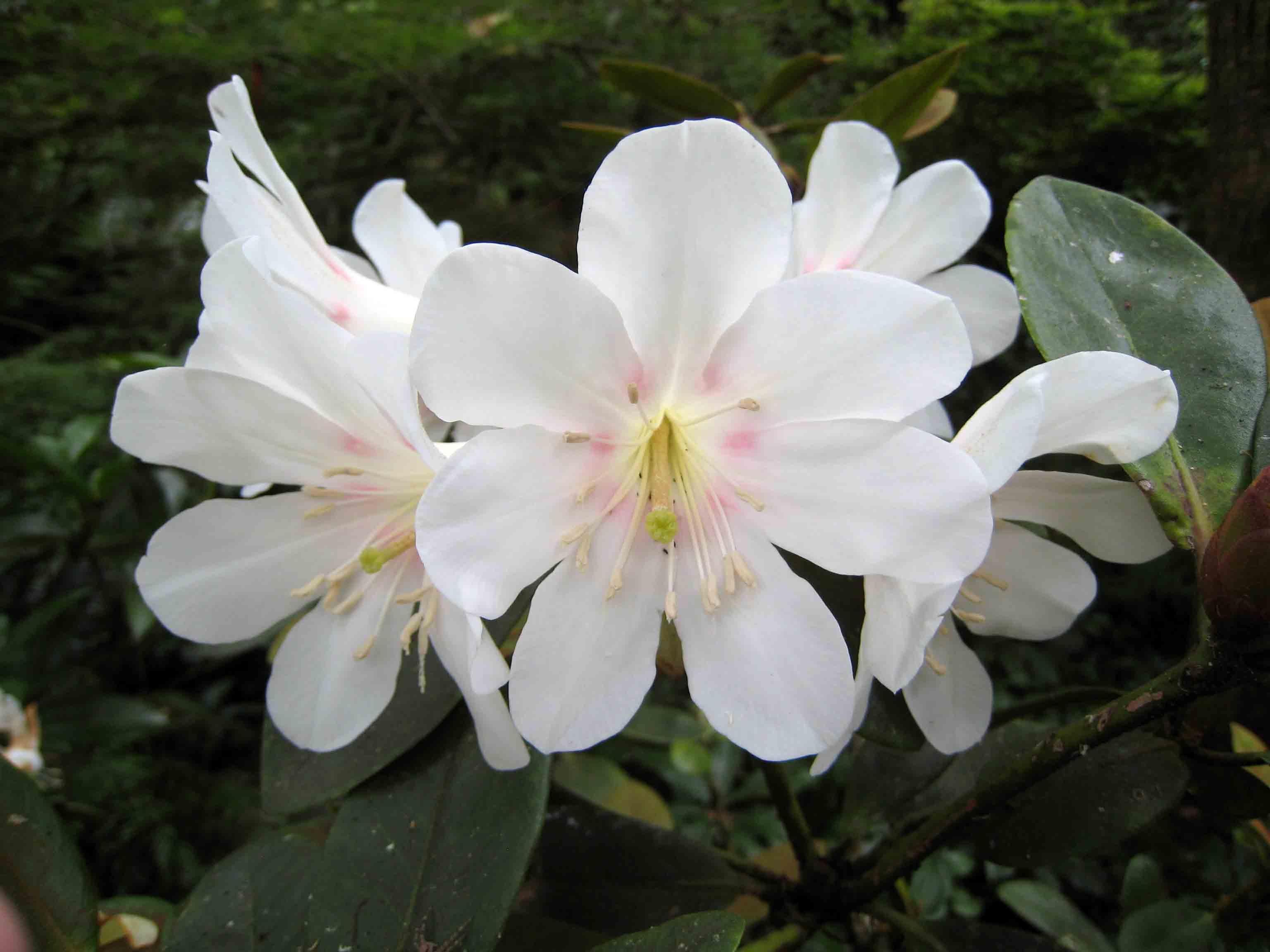

Scientific classification
- Kingdom: Plantae
- Clade: Tracheophytes
- Clade: Angiosperms
- Clade: Eudicots
- Clade: Asterids
- Order: Ericales
- Family: Ericaceae
- Genus: Rhododendron
- Species: R. konori

Binomial name
- Rhododendron konori Becc.

Synonyms
- Rhododendron astrapiae; Rhododendron devrieseanum; Rhododendron devriesianum subsp. astrapiae; Rhododendron phaeopeplum; Rhododendron tovernae

= Rhododendron konori =

Species of plant

Rhododendron konori, the Konor rhododendron, is a rhododendron species native to Irian Jaya, Indonesia, and Papua New Guinea.

== Description ==
It is an evergreen shrub growing to 3–3.5 m (9.8–11.5 ft) in height. The strongly scented flowers range from pure white to dark red.

== Taxonomy ==
The specific epithet is sometimes rendered konorii, but this is unnecessary as the name honours a local Papuan deity. The botanical name Rhododendron konori is regarded by some authorities as an unresolved name, meaning that it has not yet been established as a correct scientific name for this plant.
