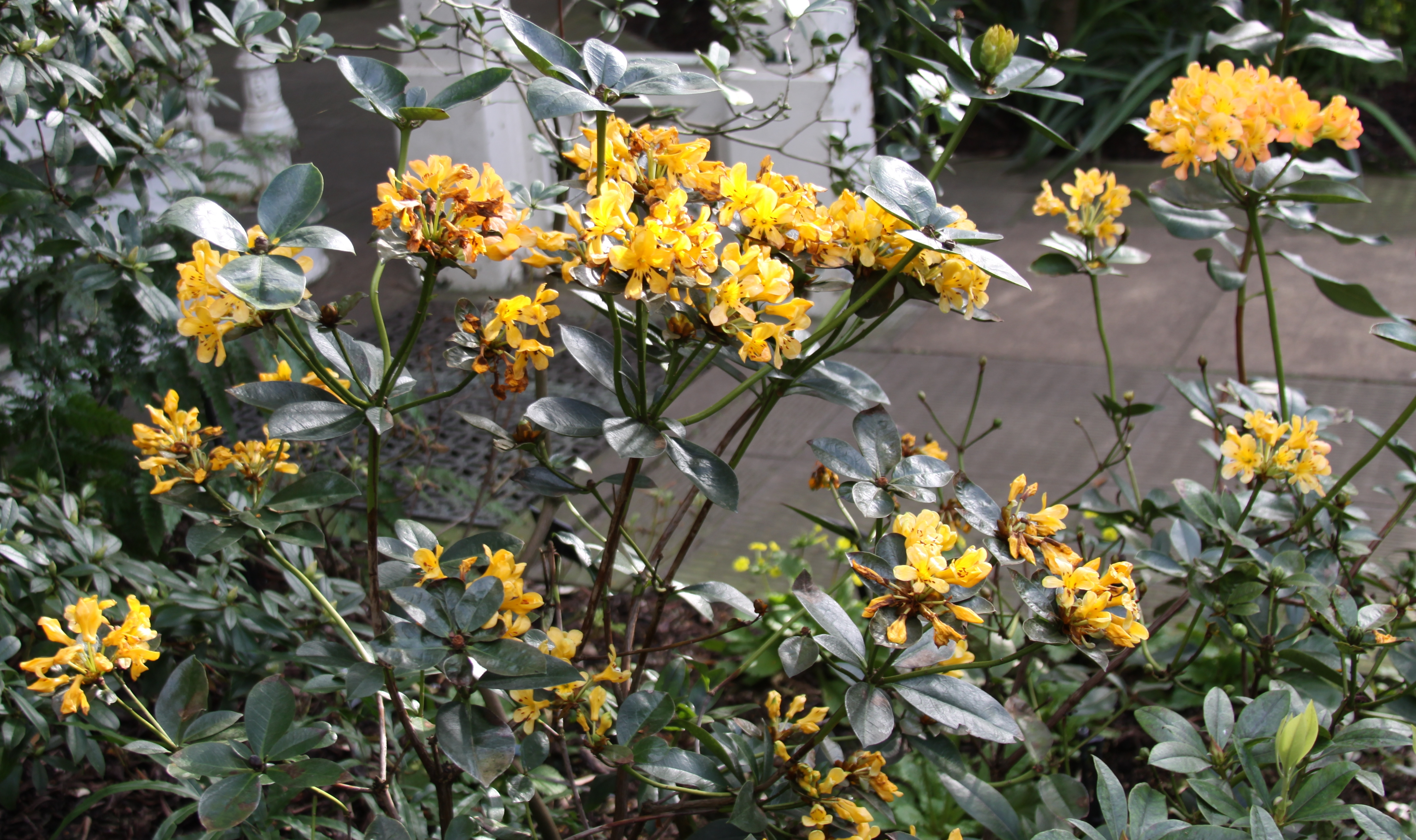
- Rhododendron macgregoriae

Scientific classification
- Kingdom: Plantae
- Clade: Tracheophytes
- Clade: Angiosperms
- Clade: Eudicots
- Clade: Asterids
- Order: Ericales
- Family: Ericaceae
- Genus: Rhododendron
- Subgenus: Rhododendron subg. Vireya
- Section: Rhododendron sect. Schistanthe; Schltr

Type species
- Rhododendron macgregoriae

Species
- See text

= Rhododendron sect. Schistanthe =

Section of rhododendrons

Rhododendron sect. Schistanthe is a section of Rhododendron sect. Vireya in the genus Rhododendron. It comprises 5 subsection of deciduous shrubs or trees native to Southeast Asia. Plants in this section have leaf scales and tailed seeds.

== Species ==
=== Subsection Euvireya ===
Rhododendron subsect. Euvireya H.F.Copel.

Image	Name	Distribution
	Rhododendron alticola Sleumer 1960	Papua New Guinea
	Rhododendron angiense J.J.Sm. 1914	New Guinea
	Rhododendron angulatum J.J.Sm. 1912	New Guinea
	Rhododendron apiense Argent 2003	Borneo (Sarawak)
	Rhododendron ardii Hutabarat, Mambrasar & Mustaqim 2022	Sulawesi
	Rhododendron arfakianum Becc. 1878	New Guinea
	Rhododendron astrophorum M.N.Tamayo, Y.P.Ang & A.S.Rob. 2023	Philippines (Palawan)
	Rhododendron atrichum Argent 2009	Borneo (Sarawak)
	Rhododendron aurigeranum Sleumer 1960	Papua New Guinea
	Rhododendron baconii Argent, A.L.Lamb & Phillipps 1984	Borneo (Sabah)
	Rhododendron baenitzianum Lauterb. 1905	Papua New Guinea
	Rhododendron beccarii Sleumer 1960	Sumatera
	Rhododendron blackii Sleumer 1973	Papua New Guinea
	Rhododendron bloembergenii Sleumer 1960	Sulawesi
	Rhododendron brachygynum H.F.Copel. 1929	Philippines (Cebu)
	Rhododendron brevipes Sleumer 1960	Papua New Guinea
	Rhododendron buruense J.J.Sm. 1932	Maluku (Buru)
	Rhododendron celebicum (Blume) DC. 1839	Sulawesi
	Rhododendron chamahense Rafidah 2012	Peninsula Malaysia (Kelatan)
	Rhododendron christi F.Först. 1914	New Guinea
	Rhododendron cockburnii (Argent, A.L.Lamb & Phillipps) Craven 2014	Borneo (Sabah)
	Rhododendron commutatum Sleumer 1960	Borneo (Sabah, Brunei, Sarawak)
	Rhododendron comparabile Sleumer 1960	Papua New Guinea
	Rhododendron crassifolium Stapf 1894	Borneo
	Rhododendron culminicola F.Muell. 1889	New Guinea
	Rhododendron curviflorum J.J.Sm. 1912	New Guinea
	Rhododendron cuspidellum Sleumer 1960	New Guinea
	Rhododendron englerianum Koord. 1909	New Guinea
	Rhododendron exuberans (Sleumer) Argent 1982	Borneo
	Rhododendron glabrifilum J.J.Sm. 1914	New Guinea
	Rhododendron glabriflorum J.J.Sm. 1915	New Guinea
	Rhododendron gracilentum F.Muell. 1889	Papua New Guinea
	Rhododendron heterolepis Danet 2010	New Guinea
	Rhododendron hirtolepidotum J.J.Sm. 2014	New Guinea
	Rhododendron impositum J.J.Sm. 1937	Sulawesi
	Rhododendron impressopunctatum J.J.Sm. 1932	Maluku (Buru)
	Rhododendron intranervatum Sleumer 1961	Borneo
	Rhododendron javanicum (Blume) Benn. 1838	Sumatera to Lesser Sunda Islands (Bali), Borneo
	Rhododendron jiewhoei Argent 2006	Borneo
	Rhododendron kemulense J.J.Sm. 1935	Borneo
	Rhododendron kochii Stein 1885	Philippines
	Rhododendron laetum J.J.Sm. 1914	New Guinea
	Rhododendron lanceolatum Ridl. 1912	Borneo
	Rhododendron leptobrachion Sleumer 1960	Sulawesi
	Rhododendron leucogigas Sleumer 1963	New Guinea
	Rhododendron leytense Merr. 1915	Philippines (Leyte, Mindanao)
	Rhododendron loboense H.F.Copel. 1929	Philippines
	Rhododendron lochiae F.Muell. 1887	Australia
	Rhododendron loerzingii J.J.Sm. 1914	Jawa
	Rhododendron lompohense Argent 1920	Sulawesi
	Rhododendron longiflorum Lindl. 1848	Borneo, Malaya, Sumatera, Thailand
	Rhododendron lowii Hook.f. 1851	Borneo (Sabah)
	Rhododendron luraluense Sleumer 1935	Solomon Islands (Bougainville)
	Rhododendron macgregoriae F.Muell. 1891	New Guinea
	Rhododendron madulidii Argent 1998	Philippines (Palawan)
	Rhododendron maxwellii Gibbs 1914	Borneo
	Rhododendron mendumiae Argent 2004	Philippines (Palawan)
	Rhododendron milleri Argent 2006	New Guinea
	Rhododendron mindanaense Merr. 1905	Philippines (Mindanao)
	Rhododendron mollianum Koord. 1909	New Guinea
	Rhododendron monkoboense Argent 2003	Borneo (Sabah)
	Rhododendron mulyaniae Mambrasar 2024	Papua
	Rhododendron nervulosum Sleumer 1940	Borneo (Sabah)
	Rhododendron orbiculatum Ridl. 1912	Borneo, Sulawesi
	Rhododendron pachycarpon Sleumer 1960	Papua New Guinea
	Rhododendron pachystigma Sleumer 1963	New Guinea
	Rhododendron perplexum Sleumer 1960	Sumatera
	Rhododendron polyanthemum Sleumer 1963	Borneo (Sabah)
	Rhododendron poremense J.J.Sm. 1937	Sulawesi.
	Rhododendron praetervisum Sleumer 1973	Borneo (Sabah)
	Rhododendron rarilepidotum J.J.Sm. 1934	Sumatera
	Rhododendron renschianum Sleumer 1940	Lesser Sunda Islands
	Rhododendron retivenium Sleumer 1960	Borneo (Sabah)
	Rhododendron reynosoi Argent 2004	Philippines (Palawan)
	Rhododendron robinsonii Ridl. 1909	Peninsula Malaysia
	Rhododendron rosendahlii Sleumer 1960	New Guinea
	Rhododendron rugosum H.Low ex Hook.f. 1851	Borneo (Sabah, Sarawak)
	Rhododendron salicifolium Becc. 1878	Borneo (Sarawak)
	Rhododendron sayeri Sleumer 1960	Papua New Guinea
	Rhododendron scabridibracteum Sleumer 1960	Papua New Guinea
	Rhododendron schlechteri Lauterb. 1905	New Guinea
	Rhododendron seranicum J.J.Sm. 1932	Maluku, Sulawesi
	Rhododendron sessilifolium J.J.Sm. 1934	Sumatera
	Rhododendron sojolense Argent 2009	Sulawesi
	Rhododendron stenophyllum Hook.f. ex Stapf 1894	Borneo
	Rhododendron stresemannii J.J.Sm. 1932	Maluku
	Rhododendron subulosum J.J.Sm. ex Sleumer 1960	New Guinea
	Rhododendron sumatranum Merr. 1934	Sumatera
	Rhododendron tjiasmantoi Mustaqim, Mambrasar & Hutabarat 2022	Sulawesi
	Rhododendron torajaense Craven 2014	Sulawesi
	Rhododendron toxopei J.J.Sm. 1934	Maluku
	Rhododendron triumphans Yersin & A.Chev. 1929	Vietnam
	Rhododendron vanvuurenii J.J.Sm. 1920	Sulawesi
	Rhododendron verticillatum H.Low ex Lindl. 1848	Borneo
	Rhododendron villosulum J.J.Sm. 1915	New Guinea
	Rhododendron viriosum Craven 2002	Australia (Queensland)
	Rhododendron wentianum Koord. 1909	New Guinea
	Rhododendron williamsii Merr. ex H.F.Copel. 1929	Philippines (Luzon)
	Rhododendron xanthopetalum Merr. 1905	Philippines (Luzon, Mindoro, Camiguin)
	Rhododendron yongii Argent 1982	Borneo (Sabah, Sarawak)
	Rhododendron zoelleri Warb. 1892	Maluku (W. Seram) to New Guinea

=== Subsection Linnaeopsis ===
Rhododendron subsect. Linnaeopsis (Schltr.) Sleumer

Image	Name	Distribution
	Rhododendron anagalliflorum Wernham 1916	New Guinea
	Rhododendron caespitosum Sleumer 1960	New Guinea
	Rhododendron capellae Kores 1978	Papua New Guinea
	Rhododendron coelorum Wernham 1916	New Guinea
	Rhododendron disterigmoides Sleumer 1960	New Guinea
	Rhododendron minimifolium Wernham 1916	New Guinea
	Rhododendron muscicola J.J.Sm. 1936	New Guinea
	Rhododendron oxycoccoides Sleumer 1960	New Guinea
	Rhododendron parvulum Sleumer 1960	New Guinea
	Rhododendron pusillum J.J.Sm. 1915	New Guinea
	Rhododendron rubineiflorum Craven 1980	New Guinea
	Rhododendron schizostigma Sleumer 1960	New Guinea
	Rhododendron womersleyi Sleumer 1960	Papua New Guinea
	Rhododendron xenium Gill.K.Br. & Craven 2003	New Guinea

=== Subsection Malesia ===
Rhododendron subsect. Malesia H.F.Copel.

Image	Name	Distribution
	Rhododendron abietifolium Sleumer 1961	Borneo
	Rhododendron acrophilum Merr. & Quisumb. 1954	Philippines (Palawan)
	Rhododendron alternans Sleumer 1960	Sulawesi
	Rhododendron atropurpureum Sleumer 1960	Papua New Guinea
	Rhododendron bagobonum H.F.Copel. 1929	Borneo, Philippines
	Rhododendron banghamiorum (J.J.Sm.) Sleumer 1960	Sumatera
	Rhododendron brassii Sleumer 1960	New Guinea
	Rhododendron brentelii Argent 2015	New Guinea
	Rhododendron burtii P.Woods 1978	Sarawak
	Rhododendron buxifolium H.Low ex Hook.f. 1852	Borneo
	Rhododendron calosanthes Sleumer 1961	New Guinea
	Rhododendron chevalieri Dop 1929	Vietnam
	Rhododendron citrinum (Hassk.) Hassk. 1844	Jawa, Lesser Sunda Is., Sumatera
	Rhododendron commonae F.Först. 1914	New Guinea
	Rhododendron cornu-bovis Sleumer 1960	New Guinea
	Rhododendron flavoviride J.J.Sm. 1915	New Guinea
	Rhododendron frey-wysslingii J.J.Sm. 1934	Sumatera
	Rhododendron hatamense Becc. 1878	New Guinea
	Rhododendron helodes Sleumer 1960	New Guinea
	Rhododendron inconspicuum J.J.Sm. 1915	New Guinea
	Rhododendron lamii J.J.Sm. 1936	New Guinea
	Rhododendron leptomorphum Sleumer 1960	Sulawesi
	Rhododendron meijeri Argent, A.L.Lamb & Phillipps 1984	Borneo
	Rhododendron multicolor Miq. 1861	Sumatera
	Rhododendron myrsinites Sleumer 1960	New Guinea
	Rhododendron nieuwenhuisii J.J.Sm. 1910	Borneo
	Rhododendron nubicola Wernham 1916	New Guinea
	Rhododendron papuanum Becc. 1878	New Guinea
	Rhododendron pauciflorum King & Gamble 1905	Peninsula Malaysia
	Rhododendron porphyranthes Sleumer 1963	New Guinea
	Rhododendron pseudobuxifolium Sleumer 1960	Sulawesi
	Rhododendron pubigermen J.J.Sm. 1934	Sumatera
	Rhododendron purpureiflorum J.J.Sm. 1915	New Guinea
	Rhododendron pyrrhophorum Sleumer 1960	Sumatera
	Rhododendron rhodostomum Sleumer 1960	Papua New Guinea
	Rhododendron ripleyi Merr. 1940	Sumatera
	Rhododendron rousei Argent & Madulid 1998	Philippines (Sibuyan)
	Rhododendron rubrobracteatum Sleumer 1960	New Guinea
	Rhododendron scarlatinum Sleumer 1960	Sulawesi (Gunung Rantemario).
	Rhododendron simulans J.J.Sm. ex Sleumer 1960	New Guinea
	Rhododendron stevensianum Sleumer 1973	Papua New Guinea
	Rhododendron subcrenulatum Sleumer 1960	New Guinea
	Rhododendron subuliferum Sleumer 1960	New Guinea
	Rhododendron sugaui Argent 2006	Borneo (Sabah)
	Rhododendron takeuchii Argent 2003	Bismarck Archipelago
	Rhododendron taxifolium Merr. 1926	Philippines (Luzon)
	Rhododendron tuhanense Argent & T.J.Barkman 2000	Borneo
	Rhododendron ultimum Wernham 1916	New Guinea
	Rhododendron vidalii Rolfe 1886	Philippines (Luzon, Mindoro)
	Rhododendron vinkii Sleumer 1963	New Guinea
	Rhododendron vitis-idaea Sleumer 1960	Papua New Guinea
	Rhododendron whiteheadii Rendle 1896	Philippines (Luzon)
	Rhododendron widjajae Argent & Mambrasar 2019	Sulawesi
	Rhododendron wilkiei Argent 2004	Philippines (Palawan)
	Rhododendron wrightianum Koord. 1912	New Guinea

=== Subsection Saxifragoidea ===
Rhododendron subsect. Saxifragoidea (Sleumer) Argent

Image	Name	Distribution
	Rhododendron saxifragoides J.J.Sm. 1915	New Guinea

=== Subsection Solenovireya ===
Rhododendron subsect. Solenovireya H.F.Copel.

Image	Name	Distribution
	Rhododendron alborugosum Argent & J.Dransf. 1989	Borneo (Kalimantan)
	Rhododendron archboldianum Sleumer 1960	Papua New Guinea
	Rhododendron armitii F.M.Bailey 1895	Papua New Guinea
	Rhododendron brachypodarium Sleumer 1963	New Guinea
	Rhododendron carrii Sleumer 1960	Papua New Guinea
	Rhododendron carringtoniae F.Muell. 1887	Papua New Guinea
	Rhododendron carstensense Wernham 1916	New Guinea
	Rhododendron cinerascens Sleumer 1960	New Guinea
	Rhododendron cruttwellii Sleumer 1960	Papua New Guinea
	Rhododendron edanoi Merr. & Quisumb. 1954	Philippines (Palawan)
	Rhododendron goodenoughii Sleumer 1960	New Guinea (Goodenough Island)
	Rhododendron hartleyi Sleumer 1973	Papua New Guinea
	Rhododendron jasminiflorum Hook. 1850	Peninsula Malaysia (Johore)
	Rhododendron lambianum Argent 2003	Borneo (Gunung Alab, Gunung Mulu)
	Rhododendron loranthiflorum Sleumer 1935	Papua New Guinea (Goodenough Island) to Solomon Islands
	Rhododendron macrosiphon Sleumer 1961	New Guinea
	Rhododendron majus (J.J.Sm.) Sleumer 1960	New Guinea
	Rhododendron mogeanum Argent 2003	Borneo (C. Kalimantan: Gunung Raya)
	Rhododendron multinervium Sleumer 1960	Papua New Guinea
	Rhododendron muscipulum Danet 2012	New Guinea
	Rhododendron natalicium Sleumer 1960	Papua New Guinea
	Rhododendron niveoflorum Argent 2003	Borneo (Sarawak)
	Rhododendron oliganthum Sleumer 1960	Papua New Guinea.
	Rhododendron oreadum Wernham 1916	New Guinea
	Rhododendron pleianthum Sleumer 1960	New Guinea
	Rhododendron pseudotrichanthum Sleumer 1964	Borneo (Kalimantan)
	Rhododendron radians J.J.Sm. 1920	Sulawesi
	Rhododendron retrorsipilum Sleumer 1961	Papua New Guinea
	Rhododendron rhodoleucum Sleumer 1961	Papua New Guinea
	Rhododendron rhodosalpinx Sleumer 1961	New Guinea
	Rhododendron roseiflorum P.F.Stevens 1978	New Guinea
	Rhododendron ruttenii J.J.Sm. 1932	Maluku (C. Seram)
	Rhododendron stapfianum Hemsl. ex Prain 1911	Borneo
	Rhododendron suaveolens Sleumer 1940	Borneo (Sabah)
	Rhododendron syringoideum Sleumer 1963	New Guinea
	Rhododendron tuba Sleumer 1960	Papua New Guinea
