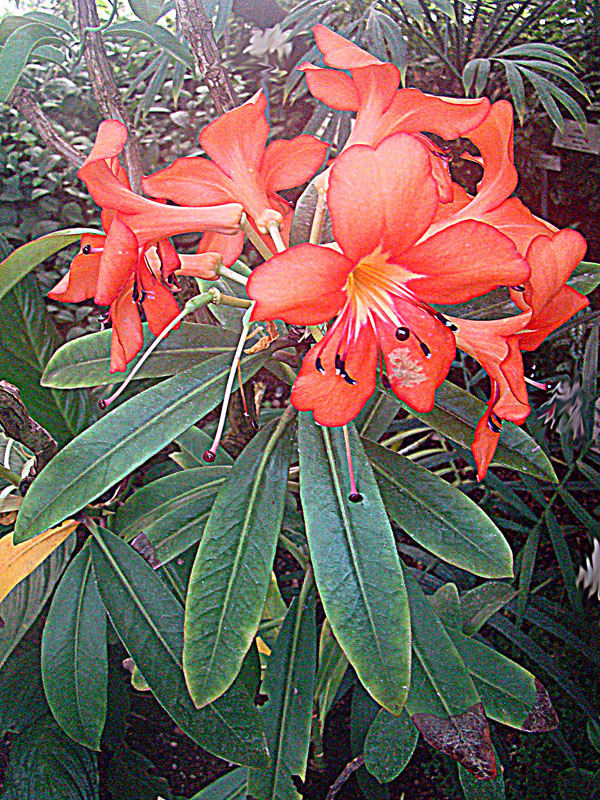
- Rhododendron javanicum

Scientific classification
- Kingdom: Plantae
- Clade: Tracheophytes
- Clade: Angiosperms
- Clade: Eudicots
- Clade: Asterids
- Order: Ericales
- Family: Ericaceae
- Genus: Rhododendron
- Subgenus: Rhododendron subg. Rhododendron
- Section: Rhododendron sect. Vireya (Blume) H.F.Copel.

Type species
- Rhododendron javanicum (Blume) Benn.

Subsections
- See text

Synonyms
- Schistanthe Schltr.

= Rhododendron sect. Vireya =

Group of shrubs

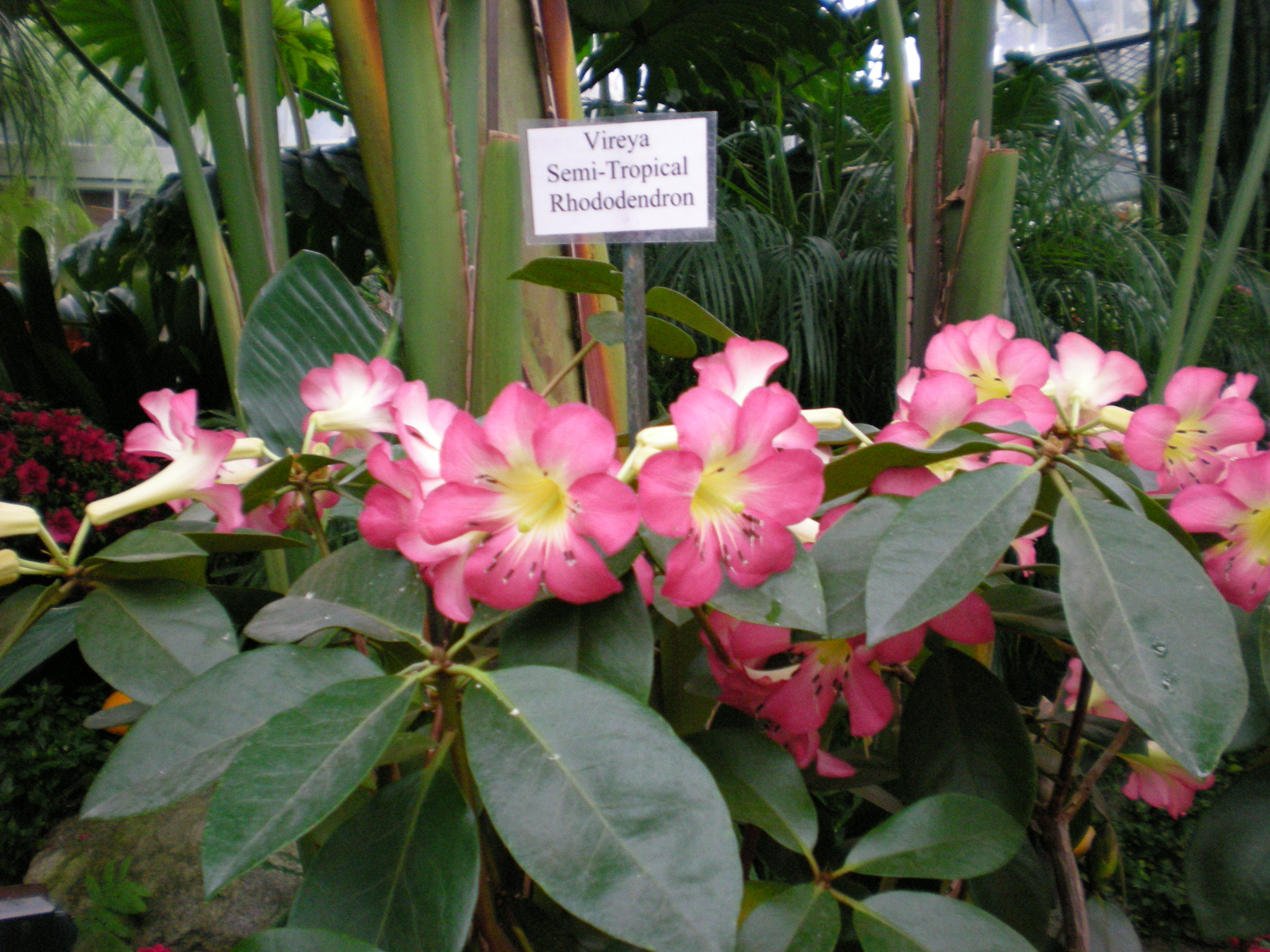
Vireya rhododendron

Rhododendron section Vireya (vireyas) is a tropical group of Rhododendron species, numbering about 300 in all. The group may also be treated as Rhododendron subgenus Vireya. Vireyas are native to southeastern Asia and range from Thailand to Australia.

== Description ==
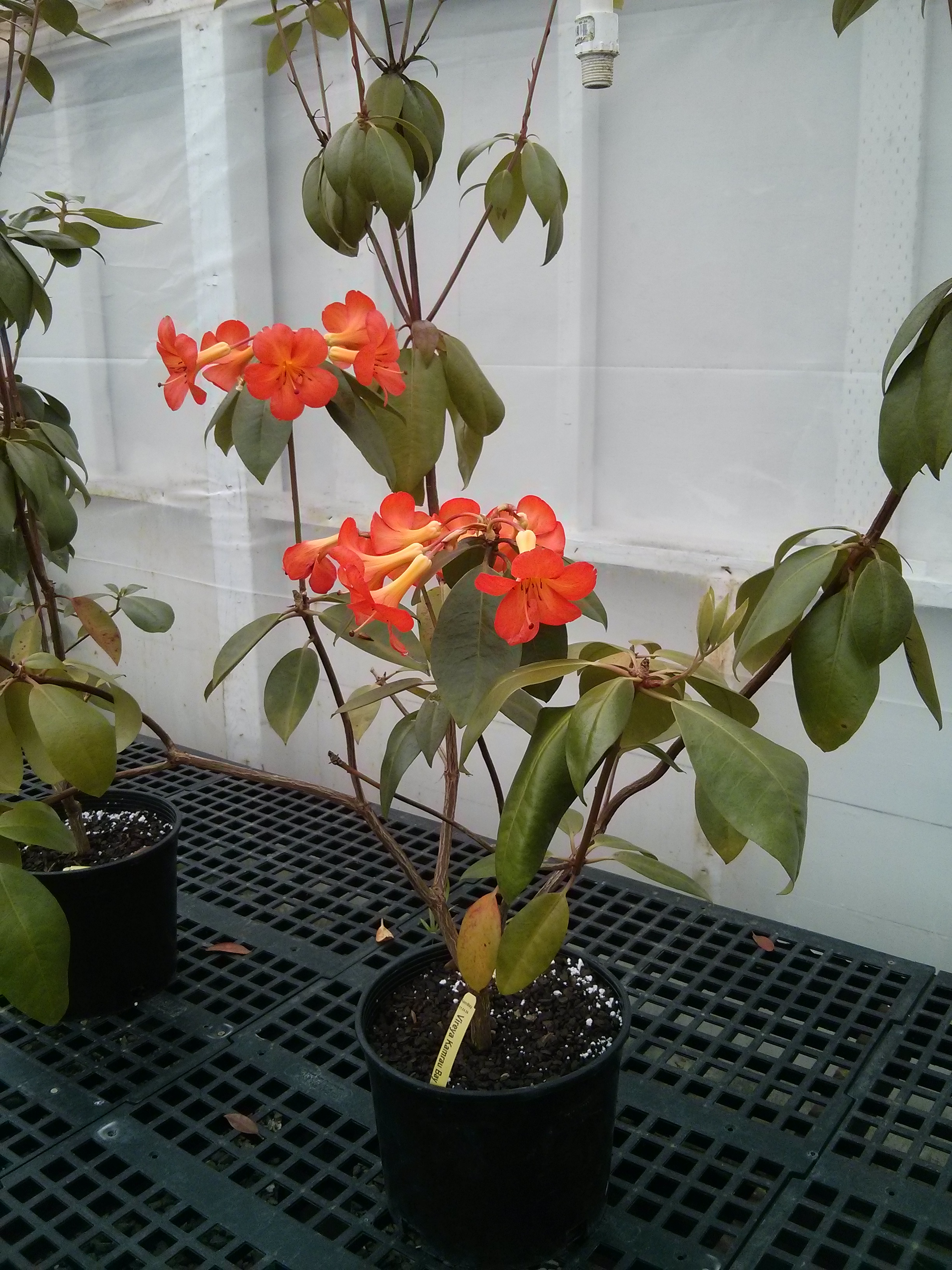
Rhododendron 'Kamrau Bay', a hybrid whose background includes R. zoelleri and R. laetum

Vireya are morphologically diverse, and characterised by seeds with tailed appendages, the presence of leaf idioblasts and capsule valves which twist upon opening.

The formal description (Craven 2008) is: Scales sessile or sometimes stalked, lobed to deeply incised or sometimes entire; corolla campanulate, trumpet-like, salver-shaped, tubular or funnel-shaped; stamens (5–)10(–16), exserted to included, staminal filaments glabrous or hairy from the base; capsule valves twisting after dehiscence; seeds with a distinct tail at each end.

== Taxonomy ==
Vireya is the largest of the three sections constituting subgenus Rhododendron, and includes about a third of all Rhododendron species. The exact classification has varied among various authors, some authors considering Vireya to be a separate subgenus rather than as here, a section of the subgenus Rhododendron. It has been suggested that taxonomic nomenclatural correctness requires changing the name of the Vireya rhododendrons to Schistanthe. Thus the term 'Vireya' has been used to refer to Section Vireya (Sleumer), Subgenus Vireya, Section Schistanthe, or the majority of the Malesian tropical rhododendrons. (Fayaz). Goetsch (2011) gives the number of species as 320, and the total taxa including subspecies, forms and varieties as 380.

=== Subdivision ===
The section has traditionally been considered to consist of seven subsections based on morphology, although Brown et al., using phylogenetic analysis, found a lack of support for monophyly of these subsections, and rather a series of clades based on geographical distribution:

- R. subsect. Albovireya Sleumer, type Rhododendron album Blume
- R. subsect. Euvireya Copel.f., type Rhododendron javanicum (Blume) Benn
- R. subsect. Malayovireya Sleumer, type Rhododendron malayanum Jack
- R. subsect. Phaeovireya Sleumer, type Rhododendron beyerinckianum Koord.
- R. subsect. Pseudovireya Clarke, type Rhododendron vaccinioides Hook.f.
- R. subsect. Siphonovireya Sleumer, type Rhododendron habbemae Koord
- R. subsect. Solenovireya Copel.f., type Rhododendron jasminiflorum Hook.

In Argent's (2006) treatment of Vireya as a subgenus, he included seven sections, with Euvireya consisting of five subsections, but this is not supported by phylogenetic analysis. These studies, for instance that of Hall (2006), suggested a very different approach. The Asian mainland species represented by Pseudovireya appear as a sister group to the other six subsections, while the Malesian species within Pseudovireya also formed an outgroup, resulting in three major clades. Thus Craven et al. proposed there be only two subsections of Vireya, corresponding to the core species, Euvireya and the much smaller Malayovireya, while the other two groups formed out of Pseudovireya be raised to section rank, keeping the original name Pseudovireya for the mainland species, and using Argent's name, Discovireya for the Malesian species. For a comparison of the Sleumer, Argent and Craven schemata, see Craven (2008), Table 1.

Thus the new subsection structure is:

- R. subsect. Euvireya Copel.f., type Rhododendron javanicum (Blume) Benn
- R. subsect. Malayovireya Sleumer, type Rhododendron malayanum Jack

Characteristics:(Craven 2008)

- Euvireya – Scales sessile or stalked, scattered or dense, not of two obviously different size classes, lobed to deeply incised (or sometimes entire) and the centre not dark-coloured.
- Malayovireya – Scales sessile, dense, of two obviously different size classes, lobed and the centre dark-coloured.

As of December 2023, World Flora Online treated the group as R. subg.Vireya, divided into seven sections:

- section Albovireya (Sleumer) Argent
- section Discovireya (Sleumer) Argent
- section Hadranthe Schltr.
- section Malayovireya (Sleumer) Argent
- section Pseudovireya (Clarke) Sleumer
- section Schistanthe Schltr.
- section Siphonovireya Argent

== Distribution ==
Vireya are found throughout the Malesian Archipelago – Peninsular Malaysia, Sumatra, Borneo, Java, the Philippines, Sulawesi, the Lesser Sunda Islands, and Maluku – and in Papuasia, which includes New Guinea, the Bismarck Archipelago, and the Solomon Islands. Some Vireya species also occur in Australia, China, India, Nepal, Taiwan, and Vietnam. Only a few non-Vireya species occur in Malesia, in the Malay Peninsula, Sumatra, and the Philippines. Malesian species are found in all subsections, while species from other areas appear only in Euvvireya, Malayovireya and Pseudovireya.

New Guinea has the most Vireya species of any island, with 167 species. Borneo has 46 species, the second most of any island.

== Bibliography ==
- Chris Callard. The History of Vireya Rhododendron Culture. Vireya Rhododendrons. 1998 onwards
- L.A. Craven, F. Danet, J.F. Veldkamp, L.A. Goetsch, B.D. Hall. Vireya Rhododendrons: their monophyly and classification (Ericaceae, Rhododendron section Schistanthe). Blumea 56, 2011: 153–158. 2011
- Goetsch, L.A., Craven, L.A. and Hall B.D. 2011. Major speciation accompanied the dispersal of Vireya Rhododendrons (Ericaceae, Rhododendron sect. Schistanthe) through the Malayan archipelago: Evidence from nuclear gene sequences. Taxon 60 (4): 1015–1028.
- Peter Adams. Evolution, Adaptive Radiation and Vireya Rhododendrons - Part I. JARS FALL 2012 pp. 201-3
- Peter Adams. Evolution, Adaptive Radiation and Vireya Rhododendrons - Part I. JARS SPRING 2013 pp. 74-76
- Biodiversity of the Vireya group of Rhododendron L. (Ericaceae) collections in New Zealand and their potential contribution to international conservation. Fayaz A. PhD Thesis, Department of Plant Science, Massey University, New Zealand. 2012
