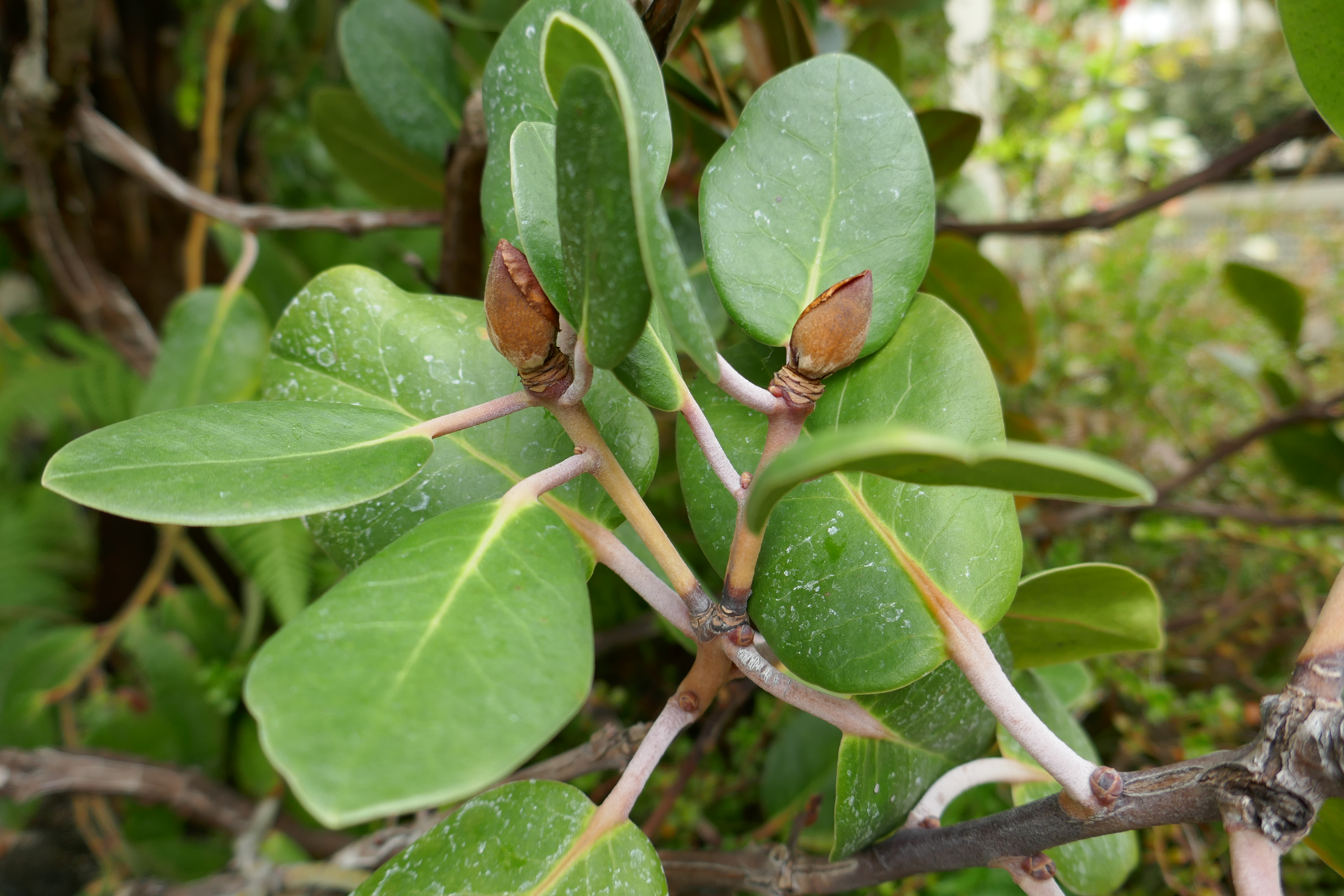
- Rhododendron konori

Scientific classification
- Kingdom: Plantae
- Clade: Tracheophytes
- Clade: Angiosperms
- Clade: Eudicots
- Clade: Asterids
- Order: Ericales
- Family: Ericaceae
- Genus: Rhododendron
- Subgenus: Rhododendron subg. Vireya
- Section: Rhododendron sect. Hadranthe

Type species
- Rhododendron hellwigii

Species
- See text

= Rhododendron sect. Hadranthe =

Section of rhododendrons

Rhododendron sect. Hadranthe is a section of Rhododendron sect. Vireya in the genus Rhododendron. It comprises 48 species of shrubs with lobbed corollas native to Southeast Asia.

== Species ==
Image	Name	Distribution
	Rhododendron andrineae Danet 2012	New Guinea
	Rhododendron asperrimum Sleumer 1963	New Guinea
	Rhododendron beyerinckianum Koord. 1912	New Guinea
	Rhododendron bryophilum Sleumer 1960	New Guinea
	Rhododendron bullifolium Sleumer 1963	New Guinea
	Rhododendron caliginis Kores 1984	New Guinea
	Rhododendron cravenii Danet 2015	New Guinea
	Rhododendron delicatulum Sleumer 1960	New Guinea.
	Rhododendron dianthosmum Sleumer 1960	New Guinea
	Rhododendron dielsianum Schltr. 1918	Papua New Guinea
	Rhododendron evelyneae Danet 2005	New Guinea
	Rhododendron extrorsum J.J.Sm. 1936	New Guinea
	Rhododendron eymae Sleumer 1960	Sulawesi
	Rhododendron gardenia Schltr. 1918	New Guinea
	Rhododendron gumineense Craven 2014	Papua New Guinea
	Rhododendron haematophthalmum Sleumer 1960	New Guinea
	Rhododendron hellwigii Warb. 1892	Papua New Guinea
	Rhododendron hooglandii Sleumer 1960	Papua New Guinea
	Rhododendron hyacinthosmum Sleumer 1973	Papua New Guinea
	Rhododendron kerowagiense Argent 2003	Papua New Guinea
	Rhododendron konori Becc. 1878	New Guinea
	Rhododendron leptanthum F.Muell. 1889	Papua New Guinea
	Rhododendron meagae Mambrasar & Hutabarat 2018	New Guinea
	Rhododendron melantherum Schltr. 1918	Papua New Guinea
	Rhododendron neobritannicum Sleumer 1973	Bismarck Archipelago
	Rhododendron neriifolium Schltr. 1918	Papua New Guinea
	Rhododendron opulentum Sleumer 1960	New Guinea
	Rhododendron phaeochiton F.Muell. 1889	New Guinea
	Rhododendron phaeochristum Sleumer 1963	New Guinea
	Rhododendron phaeops Sleumer 1960	New Guinea
	Rhododendron prainianum Koord. 1909	New Guinea
	Rhododendron psilanthum Sleumer 1960	Sulawesi
	Rhododendron pulleanum Koord. 1912	New Guinea
	Rhododendron rappardii Sleumer 1960	New Guinea
	Rhododendron rarum Schltr. 1918	New Guinea
	Rhododendron revolutum Sleumer 1960	New Guinea
	Rhododendron rhodochroum Sleumer 1960	New Guinea
	Rhododendron rubellum Sleumer 1960	Papua New Guinea
	Rhododendron solitarium Sleumer 1963	Papua New Guinea
	Rhododendron spondylophyllum F.Muell. 1889	Papua New Guinea
	Rhododendron stanleyi S.James & Argent 2017	Papua New Guinea
	Rhododendron stelligerum Sleumer 1961	New Guinea
	Rhododendron stolleanum Schltr. 1917	Papua New Guinea
	Rhododendron superbum Sleumer 1960	Papua New Guinea
	Rhododendron thaumasianthum Sleumer 1963	New Guinea
	Rhododendron tintinnabellum Danet 2005	New Guinea
	Rhododendron truncicola Sleumer 1960	Papua New Guinea
	Rhododendron tuberculiferum J.J.Sm. 1915	New Guinea
