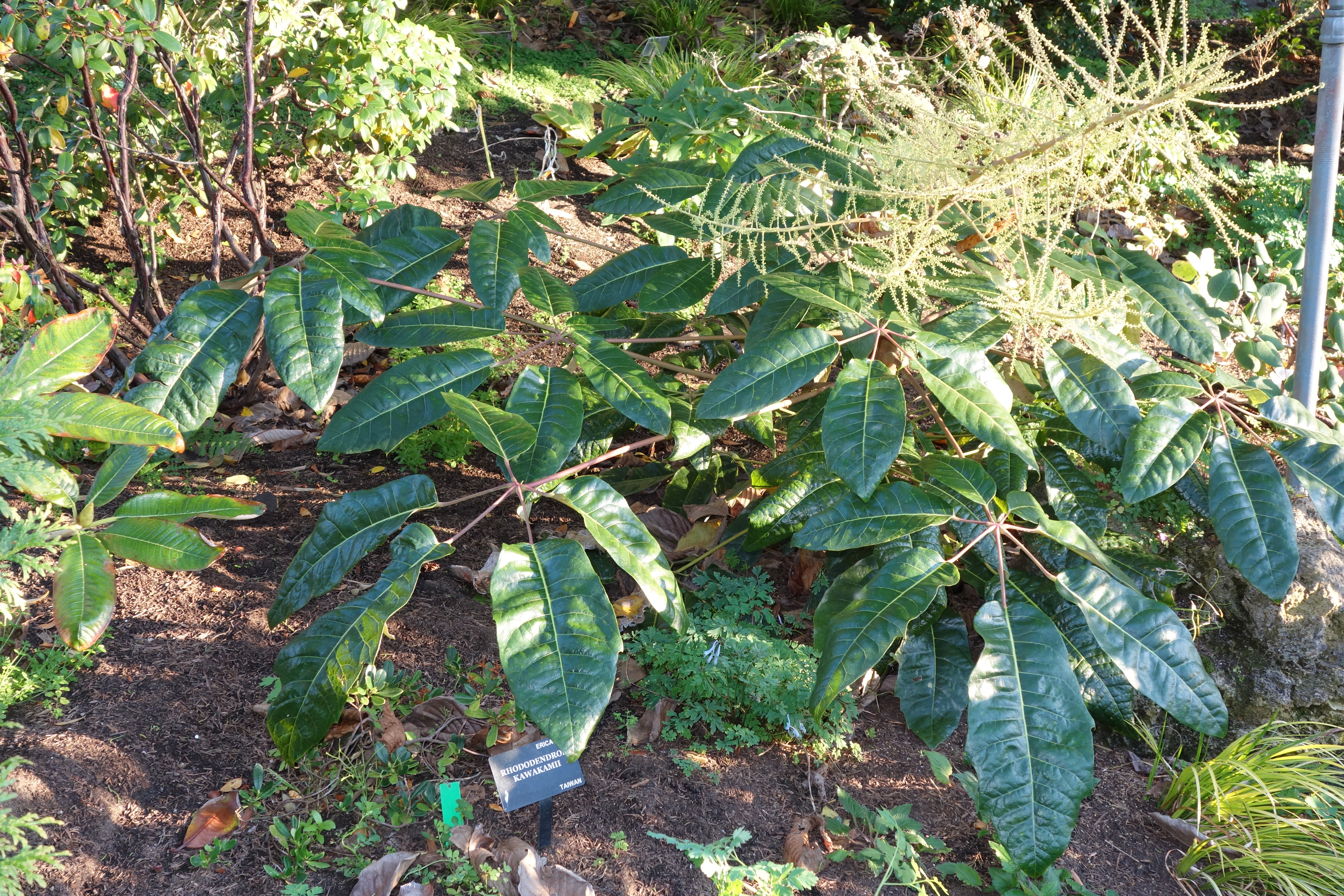
- Rhododendron kawakamii

Scientific classification
- Kingdom: Plantae
- Clade: Tracheophytes
- Clade: Angiosperms
- Clade: Eudicots
- Clade: Asterids
- Order: Ericales
- Family: Ericaceae
- Genus: Rhododendron
- Subgenus: Rhododendron subg. Vireya
- Section: Rhododendron sect. Pseudovireya (Clarke) Sleumer

Type species
- Rhododendron vaccinioides

Species
- See text

Synonyms
- Rhododendron sect. Pseudovireya (Clarke) Argent; Rhododendron subg. Pseudovireya Clarke

= Rhododendron sect. Pseudovireya =

Section of rhododendrons

Rhododendron sect. Pseudovireya is a section of Rhododendron sect. Vireya in the genus Rhododendron. It comprises 13 species from mainland Asia and Taiwan.

== Species ==
Image	Name	Distribution
	Rhododendron asperulum Hutch. & Kingdon-Ward 1927	India (Arunachal Pradesh), China (Yunnan), Myanmar
	Rhododendron datiandingense Zhi J.Feng 1996	China (Guangdong)
	Rhododendron densifolium K.M.Feng 1983	China (Yunnan), Vietnam
	Rhododendron emarginatum Hemsl. & E.H.Wilson 1910	China (Guangxi, Guizhou, Yunnan)
	Rhododendron insculptum Hutch. & Kingdon-Ward 1927	China (Yunnan), Myanmar
	Rhododendron kawakamii Hayata 1911	Taiwan
	Rhododendron longipedicellatum Lei Cai & Y.P.Ma 2016	China (Yunnan)
	Rhododendron rupivalleculatum P.C.Tam 1982	China (Guangdong, Guangxi)
	Rhododendron rushforthii Argent & D.F.Chamb. 1996	China (Yunnan), Vietnam
	Rhododendron santapaui Sastry, Kataki, Pet.A.Cox, Pat.Cox & Hutchison 1969	India (Arunachal Pradesh)
	Rhododendron sororium Sleumer 1958	Vietnam
	Rhododendron trancongii Argent & Rushforth 2010	Vietnam
	Rhododendron vaccinioides Hook.f. 1851	Nepal, China (Yunnan), Myanmar
