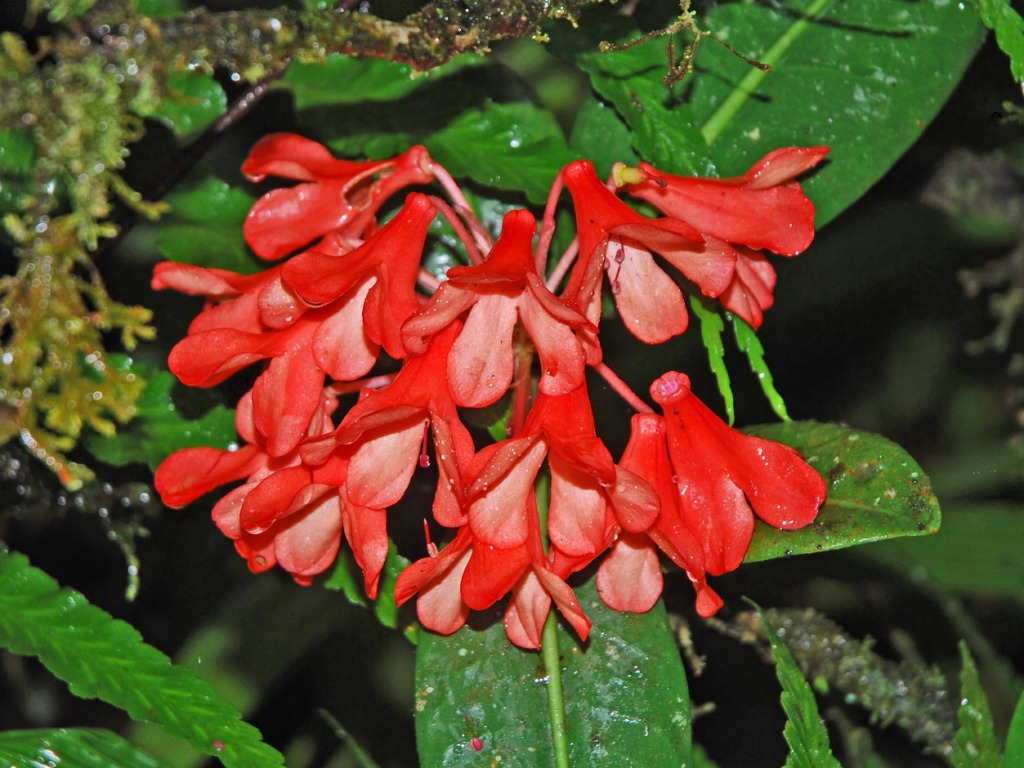
- Flowers in Kinabalu Botanical Garden, Sabah

Scientific classification
- Kingdom: Plantae
- Clade: Tracheophytes
- Clade: Angiosperms
- Clade: Eudicots
- Clade: Asterids
- Order: Ericales
- Family: Ericaceae
- Genus: Rhododendron
- Subgenus: Rhododendron subg. Vireya
- Section: Rhododendron sect. Schistanthe
- Species: R. crassifolium

Binomial name
- Rhododendron crassifolium Stapf

= Rhododendron crassifolium =

Species of plant

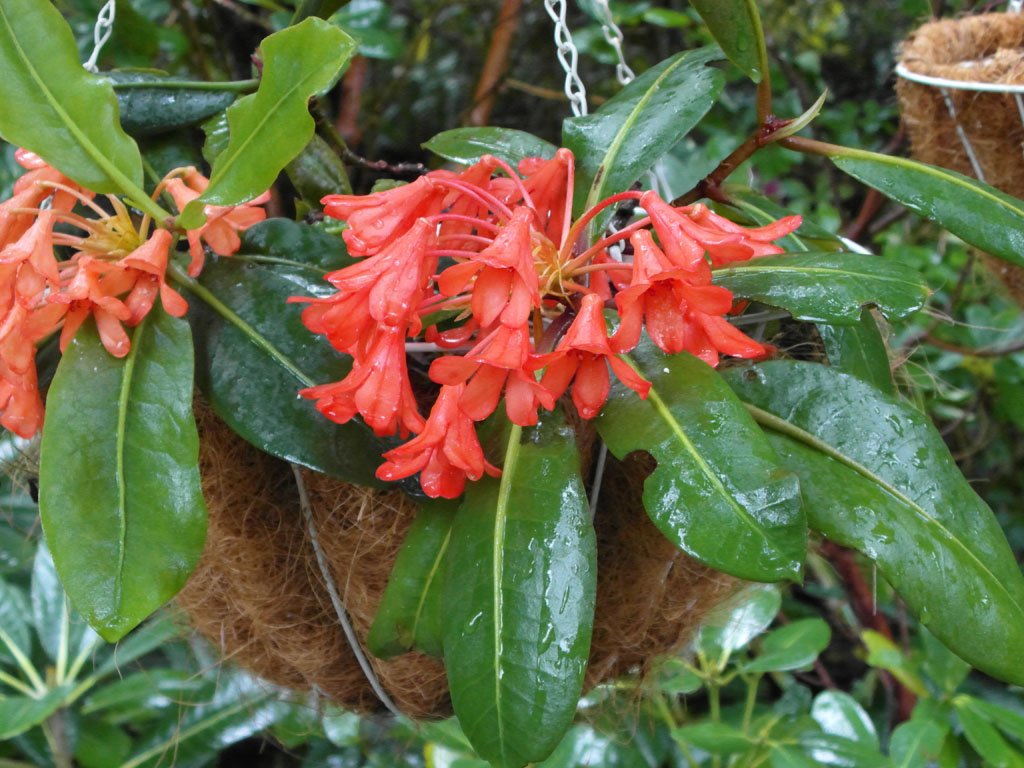
Growing in a basket hanging in a tree in a suburb of Seattle, Washington. It originally came from Borneo and was propagated by the Rhododendron Species Foundation.

Rhododendron crassifolium is a species of tropical rhododendron, a perennial flowering plant belonging to the family Ericaceae. It is placed in section Schistanthe.

== Description ==
Rhododendron crassifolium is a tropical rhododendron native to mountainside forests of Borneo at 1,200–2,200 m (3,900–7,200 ft). It is a medium size evergreen shrub about 90–120 cm (35–47 in) tall. Leaves are dark green, broad, ribbed and elliptic. The bell-shaped flowers are red-orange. The flowering period extends from June through August.

== Subspecies ==
As of February 2024, Plants of the World Online accepted two species:

- Rhododendron crassifolium var. crassifolium, synonyms Rhododendron brevitubum, Rhododendron crassinervium
- Rhododendron crassifolium var. pseudomurudense (Sleumer) Argent, synonyms Rhododendron murudense, Rhododendron pseudomurudense

== Distribution ==
The species is native to the island of Borneo.

== Habitat ==
This species is typical of the shaded mountain forests. It prefers acidic, well-drained, organic soil in partial sun to partial shade.
