= Rhododendron sect. Albovireya =

Scientific classification
- Kingdom: Plantae
- Clade: Tracheophytes
- Clade: Angiosperms
- Clade: Eudicots
- Clade: Asterids
- Order: Ericales
- Family: Ericaceae
- Genus: Rhododendron
- Subgenus: Rhododendron subg. Vireya
- Section: Rhododendron sect. Albovireya (Sleumer) Argent

Type species
- Rhododendron album

Species
- See text

Synonyms
- Rhododendron subsect. Albovireya Sleumer

Section of rhododendrons

Rhododendron sect. Albovireya is a section of Rhododendron sect. Vireya in the genus Rhododendron. It comprises 14 species of deciduous shrubs native to Southeast Asia. Plants in this section has a chromosome count of 2n = 26

== Species ==
Image	Name	Distribution
	Rhododendron aequabile J.J.Sm. 1935	W. Sumatera
	Rhododendron album Blume 1823	Java in Indonesia.
	Rhododendron arenicola Sleumer 1960	SW. Sulawesi
	Rhododendron cernuum Sleumer 1960	SW. Sumatera
	Rhododendron comptum C.H.Wright 1899	Papua New Guinea
	Rhododendron correoides J.J.Sm. 1915	W. New Guinea.
	Rhododendron giulianettii Lauterb. 1905	Papua New Guinea
	Rhododendron lagunculicarpum J.J.Sm. 1937	Sulawesi (Latimodjong Range)
	Rhododendron lampongum Miq. 1861	W. Sumatera
	Rhododendron proliferum Sleumer 1963	W. New Guinea
	Rhododendron pudorinum Sleumer 1960	Sulawesi (Letimodjong Range)
	Rhododendron versteegii J.J.Sm. 1915	W. New Guinea
	Rhododendron yelliottii Warb. 1892	Papua New Guinea
	Rhododendron zollingeri J.J.Sm. 1910	Jawa to Lesser Sunda Islands, Philippines to Sulawesi
