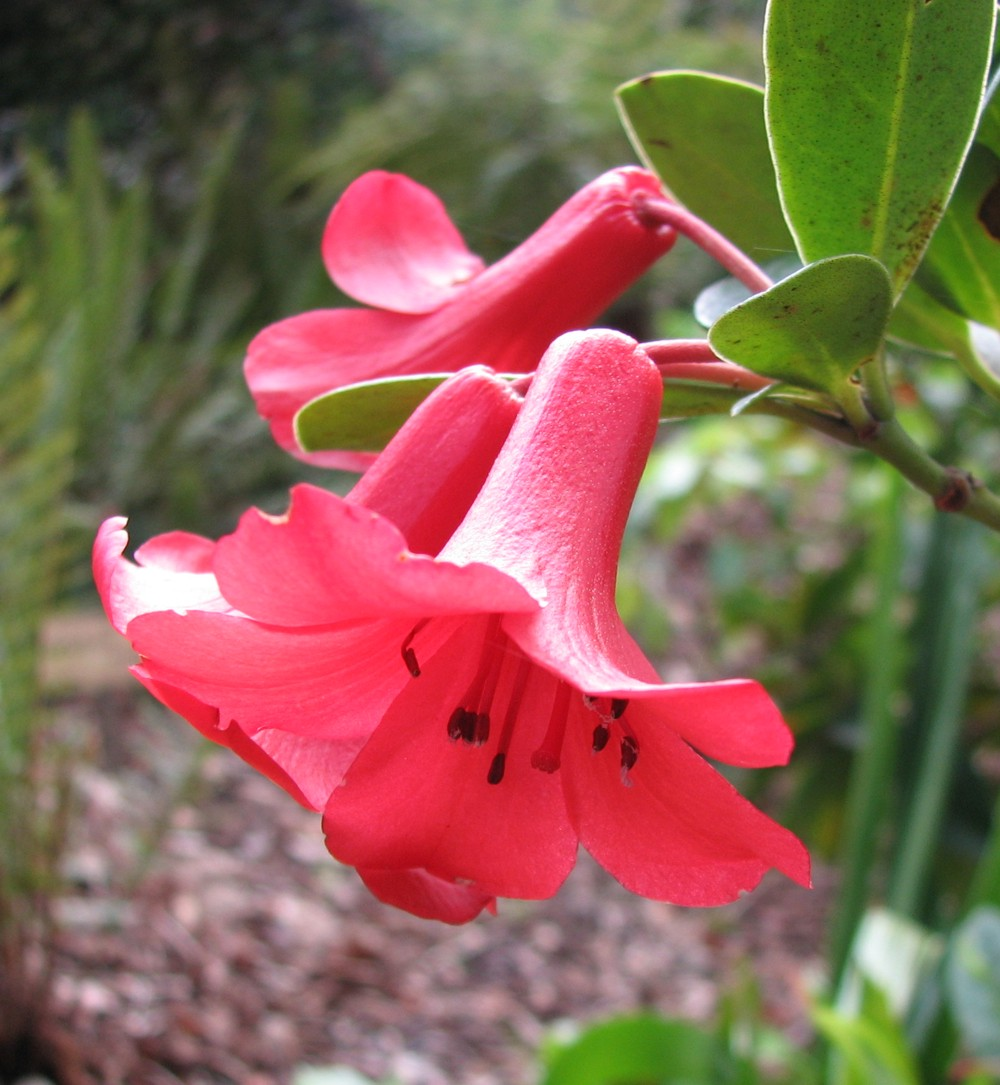

Conservation status
- Least Concern (NCA)

Scientific classification
- Kingdom: Plantae
- Clade: Tracheophytes
- Clade: Angiosperms
- Clade: Eudicots
- Clade: Asterids
- Order: Ericales
- Family: Ericaceae
- Genus: Rhododendron
- Species: R. lochiae

Binomial name
- Rhododendron lochiae F.Muell.

Synonyms
- Azalea lochiae (F.Muell.) Kuntze; Rhododendron notiale Craven

= Rhododendron lochiae =

Native rhododendron

Species of plant native to Queensland, Australia

Rhododendron lochiae is a species of plant in the family Ericaceae, and is one of only two species of the genus that are native to Australia. It is restricted to cloud forest habitats on a small number of mountain peaks within the Wet Tropics World Heritage site. The other Australian species, Rhododendron viriosum, was described in 2002 and is also restricted to high altitude cloud forest, but on different peaks to R. lochiae.

== Description ==
Rhododendron lochiae is a small shrub with glossy, elliptic leaves. In spring and summer it produces terminal clusters of waxy, red bell-shaped flowers. Each flower is about 5 cm (2.0 in) long and 3 cm (1.2 in) wide, and occurs in groups of up to six per cluster.

== Taxonomy ==
The species was first described by Ferdinand von Mueller in 1887 who gave it the specific epithet lochae in honour of Lady Loch, a patron of horticulture in Australia and wife of the Governor of Victoria. The spelling was later amended to lochiae. The type specimen was collected by William A. Sayer and A. Davidson who came across the species while ascending Mount Bellenden Ker.

It is classified within subgenus Rhododendron, section Vireya, subsection Euvireya.

Forms with a straight corolla tube that were previously included within the species were reclassified by Craven in 2002 as R. viriosum. Presently this segregate species is not recognised and its name has been resumed as a synonym of this R. lochiae. Furthermore, those specimens with a curved corolla tube, at one stage known as R. notiale Craven, remain within the present definition of R. lochiae. Therefore, all Australian plants occurring in the wild are, presently, officially known as R. lochiae.

=== Hybrids ===
A large number of hybrids have been produced from R. lochiae crossed with other species in the section Vireya.

== Distribution and habitat ==
Rhododendron lochiae occurs in cloud forests on certain mountain tops within the World Heritage Wet Tropics south of Cairns – Bell Peak (1,018 m; 3,340 ft), the Bellenden Ker range (1,592 m; 5,223 ft), and Mount Bartle Frere (1,611 m; 5,285 ft). It may grow as an epiphyte or a lithophyte in well developed rainforest and also in stunted wind-exposed forests, at altitudes above 980 m (3,220 ft). These are areas of extreme rainfall, with the annual total on Mount Bellenden Ker regularly exceeding 6 m (20 ft).

== Cultivation ==
The first record of cultivation related to a specimen which was growing, and subsequently flowering, at Kew Gardens in 1939. Plants require good drainage, constant moisture, good light and a semi-shaded position protected from frost and hot sun.
