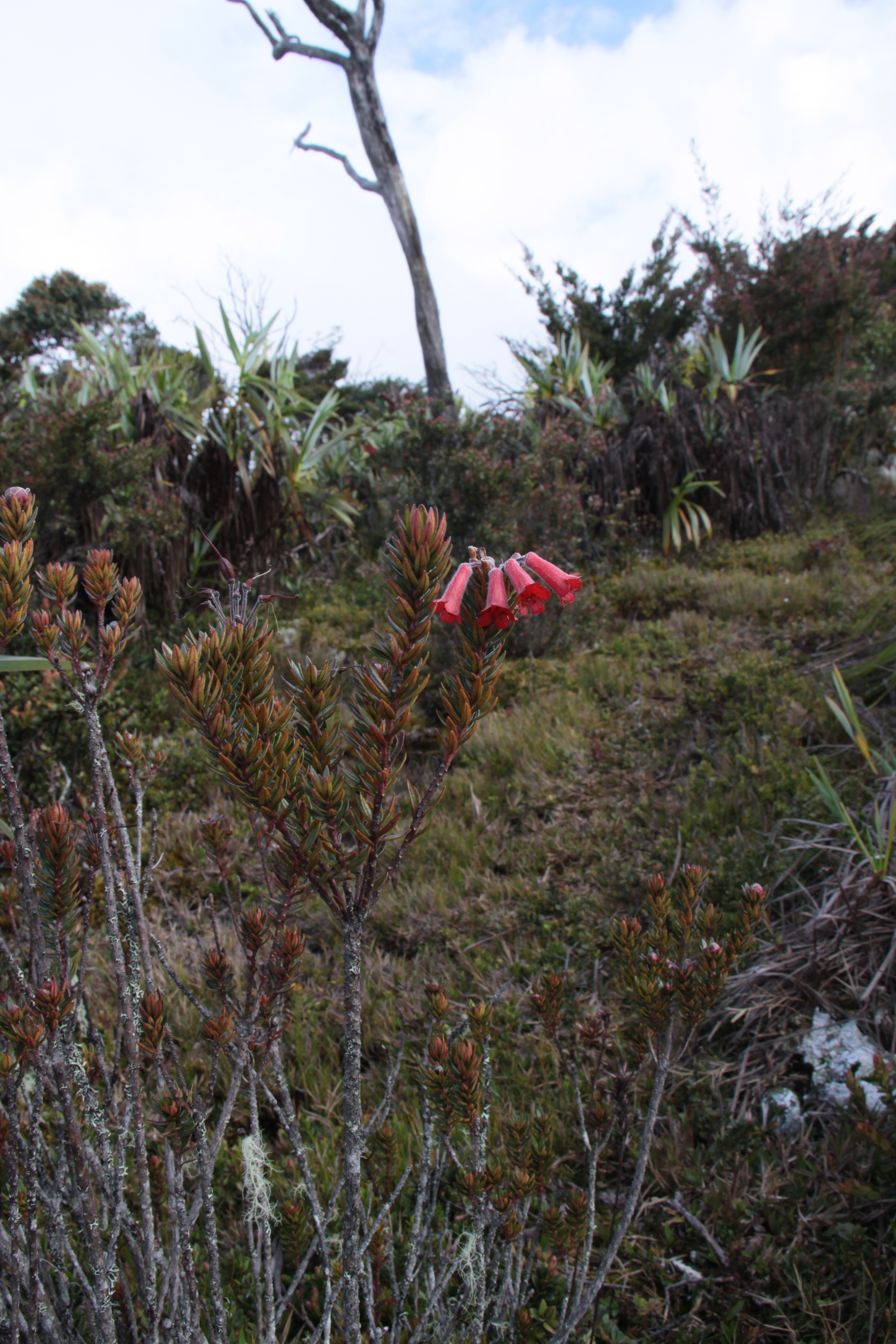
- Rhododendron adinophyllum

Scientific classification
- Kingdom: Plantae
- Clade: Embryophytes
- Clade: Tracheophytes
- Clade: Angiosperms
- Clade: Eudicots
- Clade: Asterids
- Order: Ericales
- Family: Ericaceae
- Genus: Rhododendron
- Subgenus: Rhododendron subg. Vireya
- Section: Rhododendron sect. Discovireya (Sleumer) Argent

Type species
- Rhododendron retusum

Species
- See text

Synonyms
- Rhododendron subsect. Discovireya Sleumer 1949

= Rhododendron sect. Discovireya =

Section of rhododendrons

Rhododendron sect. Discovireya is a section of Rhododendron sect. Vireya in the genus Rhododendron. It comprises 24 species of deciduous shrubs native to Southeast Asia. Plants in this section has a chromosome count of 2n = 26

== Species ==
Image	Name	Distribution
	Rhododendron adinophyllum Merr. 1940	N. Sumatera
	Rhododendron borneense (J.J.Sm.) Argent, A.L.Lamb & Phillipps 1984	Indonesia (Kalimantan); Malaysia (Sabah & Sarawak); Brunei
	Rhododendron buxoides Sleumer 1973	Borneo (N. Sarawak)
	Rhododendron ciliilobum Sleumer 1960	W. New Guinea
	Rhododendron cuneifolium Stapf 1894	Borneo (Sabah)
	Rhododendron cyrtophyllum Wernham 1916	W. New Guinea (Mt. Jaya)
	Rhododendron detznerianum Sleumer 1973	New Guinea
	Rhododendron ericoides H.Low ex Hook.f. 1851	N. Borneo (Gunung Kinabalu)
	Rhododendron erosipetalum J.J.Sm. 1936	W. New Guinea.
	Rhododendron gaultheriifolium J.J.Sm. 1936	New Guinea
	Rhododendron hameliiflorum Wernham 1916	New Guinea (Mt. Jaya)
	Rhododendron lindaueanum Koord. 1912	New Guinea
	Rhododendron meliphagidum J.J.Sm. 1932	Maluku
	Rhododendron monodii (H.J.Lam) Argent 2006	Sulawesi
	Rhododendron nanophyton Sleumer 1960	Sulawesi (Gunung Rantemario)
	Rhododendron nummatum J.J.Sm. 1936	New Guinea
	Rhododendron oreites Sleumer 1960	New Guinea
	Rhododendron perakense King & Gamble 1905	Peninsular Malaysia (Pahang)
	Rhododendron quadrasianum S.Vidal 1886	Philippines (Luzon, Mindoroa)
	Rhododendron retusum (Blume) Benn. 1838	Sumatera to Lesser Sunda Islands (Bali)
	Rhododendron scortechinii King & Gamble 1905	Peninsular Malaysia
	Rhododendron seimundii J.J.Sm. 1935	Peninsular Malaysia (Gunung Tahan).
	Rhododendron spathulatum Ridl. 1912	Peninsular Malaysia (Perak, Pahang)
	Rhododendron taxoides J.J.Sm. 1936	W. New Guinea
