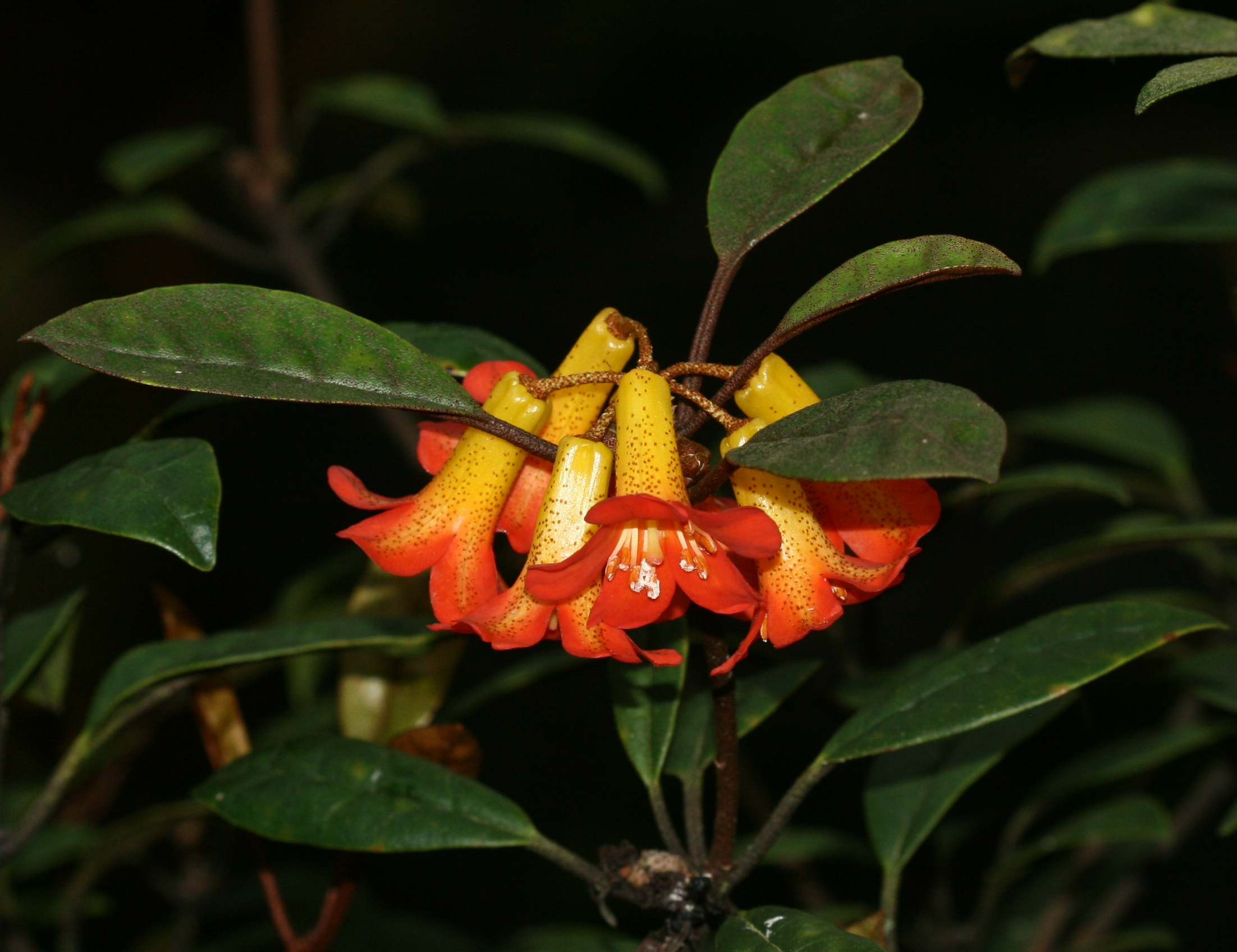
- Rhododendron lamrialianum

Scientific classification
- Kingdom: Plantae
- Clade: Tracheophytes
- Clade: Angiosperms
- Clade: Eudicots
- Clade: Asterids
- Order: Ericales
- Family: Ericaceae
- Genus: Rhododendron
- Subgenus: Rhododendron subg. Vireya
- Section: Rhododendron sect. Malayovireya (Sleumer) Argent

Type species
- Rhododendron malayanum

Species
- See text

= Rhododendron sect. Malayovireya =

Section of rhododendrons

Rhododendron sect. Malayovireya is a section of Rhododendron sect. Vireya in the genus Rhododendron. It comprises 12 species of deciduous shrubss native to Southeast Asia. Plants in this section has a chromosome count of 2n = 26

== Species ==
Image	Name	Distribution
	Rhododendron acuminatum Hook.f. 1851	Borneo (Gunung Kinabalu, Gunung Alab)
	Rhododendron apoanum Stein 1885	Philippines (Mindanao)
	Rhododendron asperum J.J.Sm. 1914	W. New Guinea (Arfak Mountains)
	Rhododendron benomense Rafidah & A.C.Elliott 2022	Peninsula Malaysia (G. Benom)
	Rhododendron durionifolium Becc. 1878	Borneo
	Rhododendron fallacinum Sleumer 1960	Borneo (Sabah, Sarawak)
	Rhododendron fortunans J.J.Sm. 1920	Borneo (Bukit Raya)
	Rhododendron himantodes Sleumer 1940	Borneo
	Rhododendron lamrialianum Argent & T.J.Barkman 2000	Borneo (Gunung Trus Madi, Gunung Alab)
	Rhododendron lineare Merr. 1960	Borneo (Brunei, Sarawak)
	Rhododendron malayanum Jack 1822	Peninsula Thailand to Malesia.
	Rhododendron micromalayanum Sleumer 1973	Borneo (Sabah, Sarawak)
	Rhododendron nortoniae Merr. 1906	Philippines
	Rhododendron vinicolor Sleumer 1960	N. Sumatera
