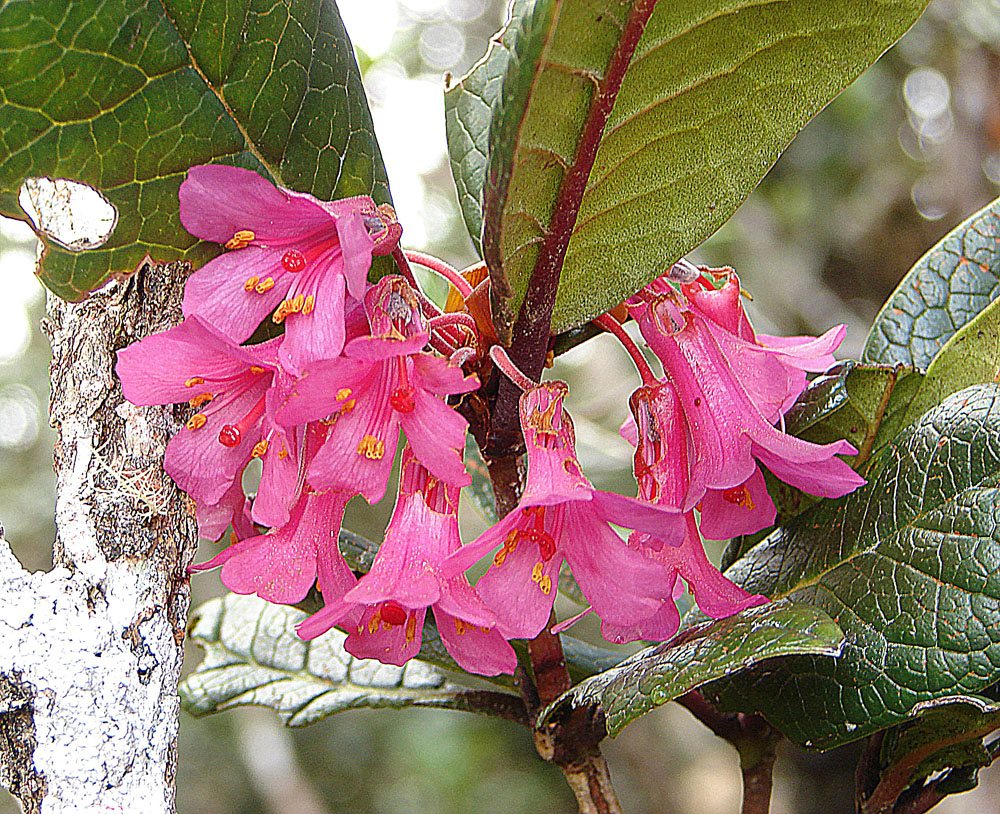

Conservation status
- Least Concern (IUCN 3.1)

Scientific classification
- Kingdom: Plantae
- Clade: Embryophytes
- Clade: Tracheophytes
- Clade: Spermatophytes
- Clade: Angiosperms
- Clade: Eudicots
- Clade: Asterids
- Order: Ericales
- Family: Ericaceae
- Genus: Rhododendron
- Species: R. rugosum

Binomial name
- Rhododendron rugosum H.Low ex Hook.f.

Varieties
- Rhododendron rugosum var. laeve Argent, A.Lamb & Phillipps (synonyms Rhododendron kinabaluense Merr. and Rhododendron rugosum var. kinabaluense (Merr.) Argent); Rhododendron rugosum var. rugosum

= Rhododendron rugosum =

Species of flowering plant

Rhododendron rugosum is a species of rhododendron native to Borneo. It is found in the high mountains, including Mount Kinabalu, in Sabah state of northeastern Borneo.

== Description ==
Rhododendron rugosum is a shrub or small tree which grows up to 8 metres (26 ft) in height. It grows as an epiphyte or as a terrestrial plant.

== Range and habitat ==
Rhododendron rugosum has two subspecies. Rhododendron rugosum var. rugosum grows on Mount Kinabalu, Mount Trus Madi, and Mount Alab in Sabah, with an uncertain record of occurrence on Mount Murud in Sarawak. Rhododendron rugosum var. laeve is found only on Mount Kinabalu. The species' extent of occurrence (EOO) is approximately 6,968 km^{2}.

It is native to upper montane rain forest and subalpine shrubland and alpine meadows from 2,000 to 3,500 metres (6,600 to 11,500 ft) elevation. It grows in varying habitats, from shady locations in low mossy forests to sunny exposed locations on rocky ridges.

== Conservation ==
Rhododendron rugosum lives at high elevations where deforestation is limited, and part of its range is in protected areas including Kinabalu Park. Its conservation status is assessed as Least Concern.
