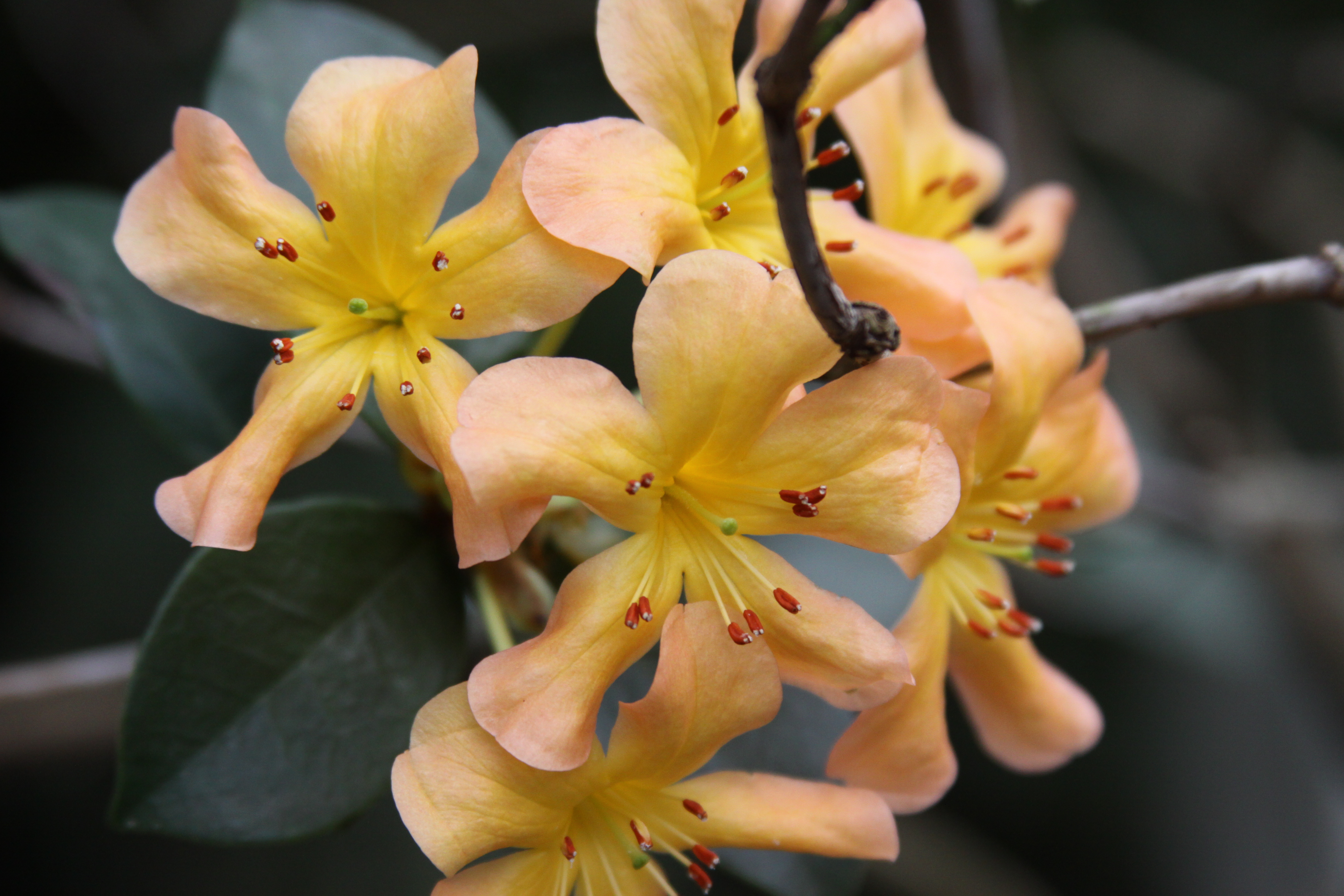

Scientific classification
- Kingdom: Plantae
- Clade: Tracheophytes
- Clade: Angiosperms
- Clade: Eudicots
- Clade: Asterids
- Order: Ericales
- Family: Ericaceae
- Genus: Rhododendron
- Species: R. macgregoriae

Binomial name
- Rhododendron macgregoriae F.Muell.

Synonyms
- Rhododendron calceolarioides; Rhododendron gorumense; Rhododendron hansemanni; Rhododendron lauterbachianum; Rhododendron vonroemeri

= Rhododendron macgregoriae =

Species of plant

Rhododendron macgregoriae is a rhododendron species native to Indonesia and Papua New Guinea at altitudes of 500–3,350 m (1,640–10,990 ft). It is an evergreen shrub or tree purportedly growing to 15 m (49 ft) in height, with leaves that are ovate-elliptic or obovate-elliptic, 40–140 × 25–50 mm in size. The flowers are light yellow to orange.

R. macgregoriae is relatively easy to grow in cultivation and a popular parent for hybrid cultivars. Today, nearly one hundred named cultivars are of "mac" descent.
