= Rhododendron loerzingii =

Conservation status
- Vulnerable (IUCN 2.3)

Scientific classification
- Kingdom: Plantae
- Clade: Tracheophytes
- Clade: Angiosperms
- Clade: Eudicots
- Clade: Asterids
- Order: Ericales
- Family: Ericaceae
- Genus: Rhododendron
- Species: R. loerzingii

Binomial name
- Rhododendron loerzingii J.J. Smith

Species of plant

Rhododendron loerzingii is a species of plant in the family Ericaceae. It is endemic to Java in Indonesia. It is threatened by habitat loss.
