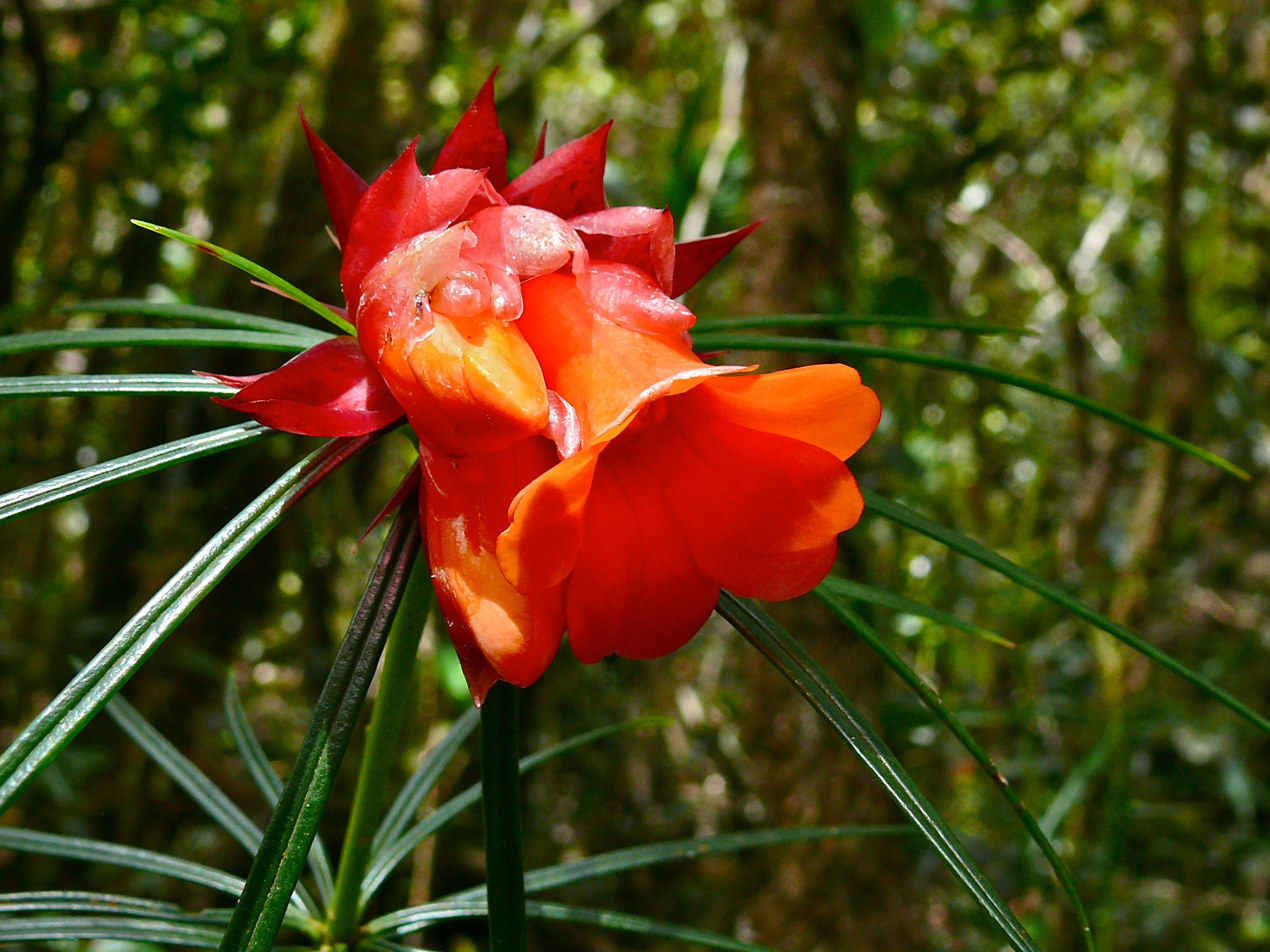

Scientific classification
- Kingdom: Plantae
- Clade: Embryophytes
- Clade: Tracheophytes
- Clade: Spermatophytes
- Clade: Angiosperms
- Clade: Eudicots
- Clade: Asterids
- Order: Ericales
- Family: Ericaceae
- Genus: Rhododendron
- Species: R. stenophyllum

Binomial name
- Rhododendron stenophyllum Hook.f. ex Stapf

Synonyms
- Rhododendron stenophyllum subsp. angustifolium (J.J.Sm.) Argent, A.Lamb & Phillipps; Rhododendron stenophyllum subsp. stenophyllum

= Rhododendron stenophyllum =

Species of flowering plant

Rhododendron stenophyllum is a species of rhododendron native to Borneo. It an epiphyte or terrestrial shrub, native to Mount Kinabalu and other mountains in Malaysia's Sabah state. The species name stenophyllum means 'narrow leaved'. It grows in montane rain forest.
