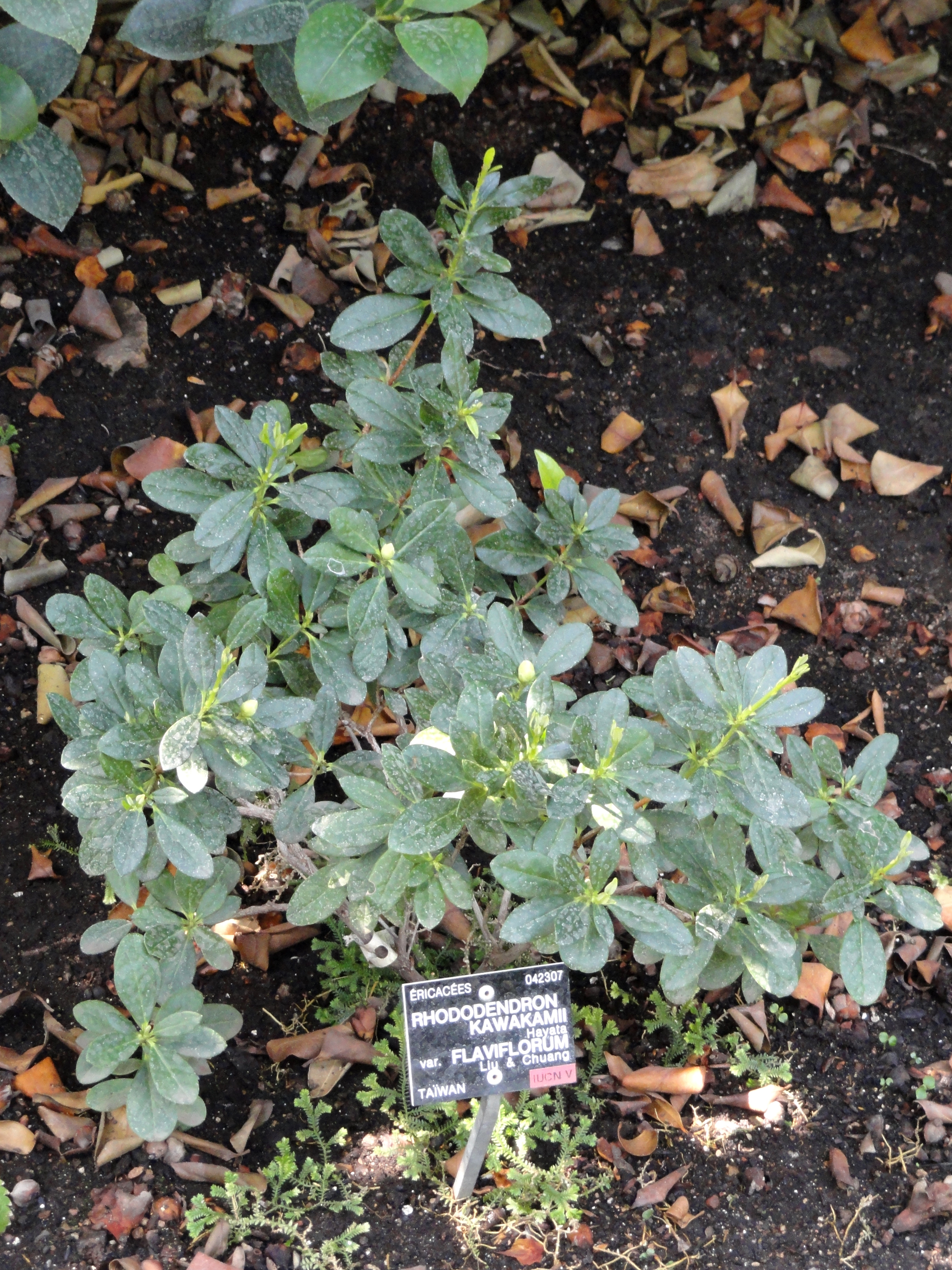
- Rhododendron kawakamii in the Jardin Botanique de Lyon, Lyon, France

Scientific classification
- Kingdom: Plantae
- Clade: Tracheophytes
- Clade: Angiosperms
- Clade: Eudicots
- Clade: Asterids
- Order: Ericales
- Family: Ericaceae
- Genus: Rhododendron
- Species: R. kawakamii

Binomial name
- Rhododendron kawakamii Hayata

= Rhododendron kawakamii =

Species of plant

Rhododendron kawakamii is a plant endemic to Taiwan. It is also called Kawakami's rhododendron, as the type specimen was collected by Takiya Kawakami and others from Mount Niitaka (today named Yu Shan or Mount Jade). This species is the only native, epiphytic, yellow flowered rhododendron in Taiwan, and is scattered in the fog forest belt of the island at an altitude of about 1,500 to 2,500 m (4,900 to 8,200 ft). It was first published as a new species by Bunzo Hayata in 1911. The wild community was assessed as "near-threatened" in the Taiwan Red Book of Vascular Plants in 2017.

== Description ==
This plant is an epiphytic shrub with a height of around 30 to 130 cm (12 to 51 in). The branches are well developed, often curved, with smooth and hairless surface with glandular dots. Bud scales have a sharp tip and tiny cilia on the surface.

The leaves range from 2.5 to 5 cm (0.98 to 1.97 in) long and 1.5 to 3 cm (0.59 to 1.18 in) wide, clustered, thick leathery, obovate, with a blunt or small apex. The base of the leaf is acuminate to sharp, and the leaf margin is slightly curved backward. The upper surface of the leaf is dark green, smooth and hairless, while the lower surface of the leaf is lighter in color with the middle rib and lateral veins depressed on the upper surface and raised on the lower surface. The leaf stalk is about 0.25 cm long and has wings.

The inflorescence tends to have 2 to 5 flowers growing in a corymbose shape, resembling umbrella ribs. The flower stalk is approximately 2 to 2.5 cm (0.79 to 0.98 in) long, with sparse glandular dots on the surface. The calyx is five-lobed and dish-shaped. Normally, the lobes are irregular, with glandular dots and short cilia. The corolla is yellow and bell-shaped with five petals which are about 1 cm (0.39 in) long and 1 to 1.2 cm (0.39 to 0.47 in) wide. They are oval in shape with glandular dots, spirally arranged on the disk. Generally, there are 10 stamens, which vary in length. Pistils are slightly shorter than stamens. The capsules are ovoid, 0.8–1.2 cm (0.31–0.47 in) long and sparsely villous on the surface.

== Classification ==
Rhododendron kawakamii was first described by the Japanese botanist Bunzo Hayata in 1911. The specimens collected by Hayata himself, Kawakami Takiya, and Mori Ushinosuke from Yushan, Luandashan and other locations in Taiwan were published as a new species in Volume 30 of the Journal of the College of Science, Imperial University of Tokyo. In addition to describing the specimen's morphology in detail, Hayata also discussed the similarities and differences between this species and Rhododendron emarginatum, Rhododendron anthopogonoides, and dwarf rhododendron (Rhododendron pumilum) from the Himalayas. However, the corolla color was not mentioned in the article.

When Ryozo Kanehira published "Taiwan Tree Chronicle" in 1936, in addition to citing the results of Hayata in 1911, he also added that the flower color of this species was white to pink. In 1960, Tang-Shui, Liu and Can-Yang, Chuang retained Ryozo Kanehira's views, and treated the yellow-flowered species as a new variety of yellow-flowered rhododendron (R. kawakamii var. flaviflorum), which was later incorporated into Volume 4, Flora of Taiwan (Edition 1) in 1978. Several characteristics, including flower color, are used to distinguish the two species in the retrieval table. In 1989 Sheng-You Lu and Yuen-Po Yang combined their field observations and speculated that Ryozo Kanehira's description of the flower color of the three pairs was wrong, and there might be no other flower colors except yellow in this species. Flora of Taiwan (Edition 2) in 1998 only accepted the scientific name originally published by Hayata, and clearly described the bright yellow corolla of this species, without mentioning other flower colors.

== Distribution and habitat ==
This species is only found in Taiwan. Its known, recorded locations include Taiping Mountain in Yilan, Taman Mountain in Taoyuan, Yuanyang Lake area in Hsinchu, Luandashan in Nantou, Alishan in Chiayi, Dagui Lake area in Kaohsiung, Wutou Mountain in Pingtung, and Mizuho Forest Road in Hualien. The distribution locations and habitats are mostly mountain fog forests with an altitude of 1,500 to 2,500 meters. Normally, they are attached to large trees or rock walls, including to the branches of the Taiwan red cypress (Chamaecyparis formosensis Matsum).

== Artificial breeding ==
Attempts have been made to breed this species artificially. For example, in 2018, Lei-Chen Lin team from Chiayi University in Taiwan worked with Sun-Link-Sea Forest and Nature Resort Corp., to cultivate seedlings. The seedlings were cultivated with rhododendron symbiotic bacteria. Another example comes from Ya-Ling Ho and Yue-Ken Liao's team at Chiayi University, which used plant tissue culture technology in 2020 to promote bud reproduction with growth regulators such as isopentenyl adenine, and thereby accelerate the growth rate and yield of seedlings.
