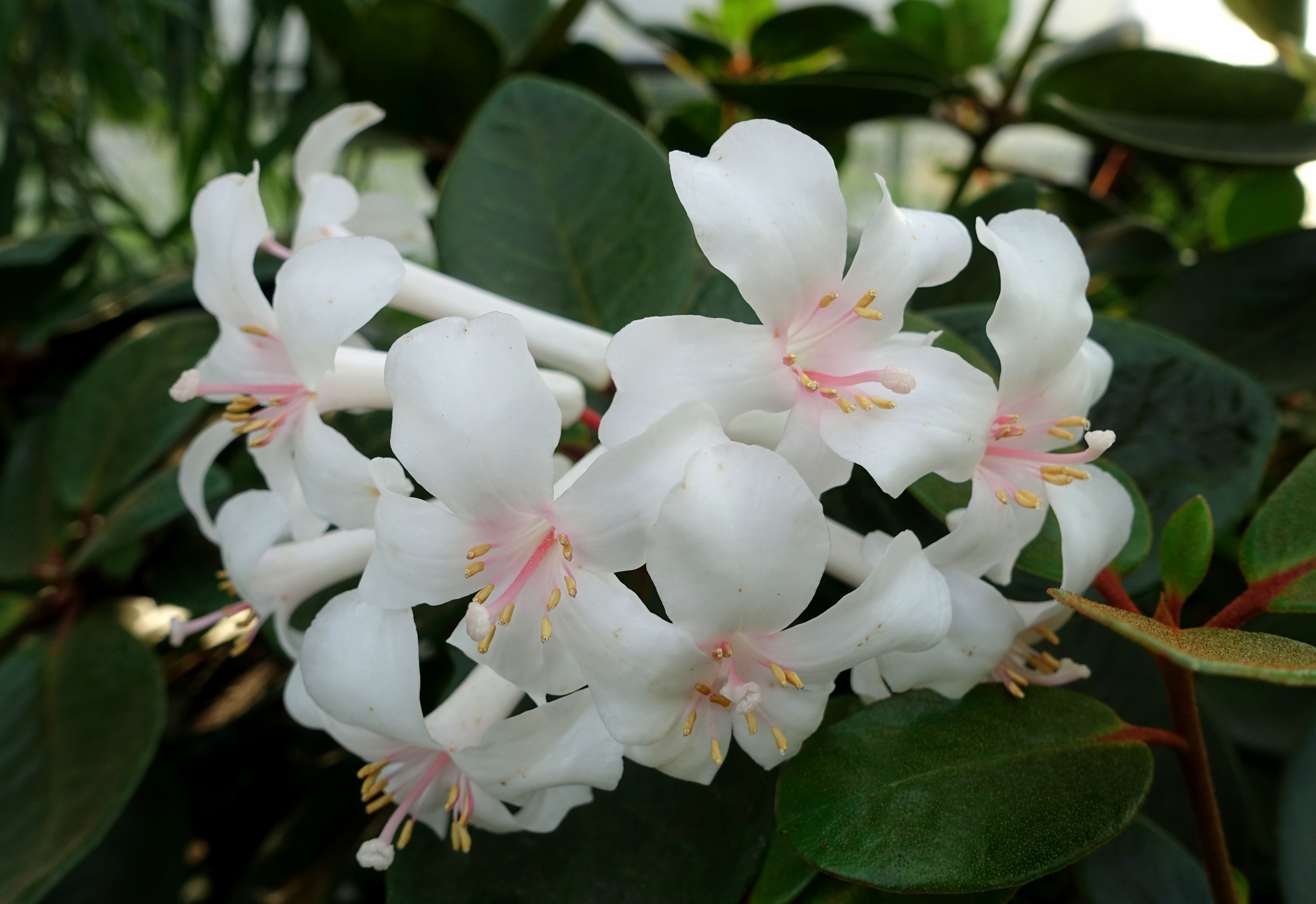

Scientific classification
- Kingdom: Plantae
- Clade: Tracheophytes
- Clade: Angiosperms
- Clade: Eudicots
- Clade: Asterids
- Order: Ericales
- Family: Ericaceae
- Genus: Rhododendron
- Species: R. jasminiflorum

Binomial name
- Rhododendron jasminiflorum T.Moore & Ayres

Synonyms
- Homotypic Synonyms: Azalea jasminiflora (T.Moore & Ayres) Kuntze

= Rhododendron jasminiflorum =

Species of plant

Rhododendron jasminiflorum is a species of flowering plant in the family Ericaceae. It is native to Borneo, Peninsular Malaysia, the Philippines, Sumatra.

== Description ==
Growing to 2.5 m (8.2 ft) in height, it is an evergreen shrub with clusters of slightly fragrant, narrowly trumpet-shaped flowers that open pink, turning white.

== Range and habitat ==
Rhododendron jasminiflorum is native to Peninsular Malaysia, northern and eastern Sumatra, Sarawak on Borneo, and the island of Mindanao in the Philippines. It grows in humid forests from sea level to 3,100 meters elevation, most commonly in lower montane forests at about 1,000 m.

== Subspecies ==
Five subspecies are accepted:

- Rhododendron jasminiflorum subsp. chamaepitys (Sleumer) Argent – Borneo (Sarawak: Gunung Lambir)
- Rhododendron jasminiflorum subsp. copelandii (Merr.) Argent – Philippines (Mindanao)
- Rhododendron jasminiflorum subsp. heusseri (J.J.Sm.) Argent – northern and eastern Sumatra
- Rhododendron jasminiflorum subsp. jasminiflorum – Peninsular Malaysia
- Rhododendron jasminiflorum subsp. oblongifolium (Sleumer) Argent – Peninsular Malaysia and Borneo (Sarawak)
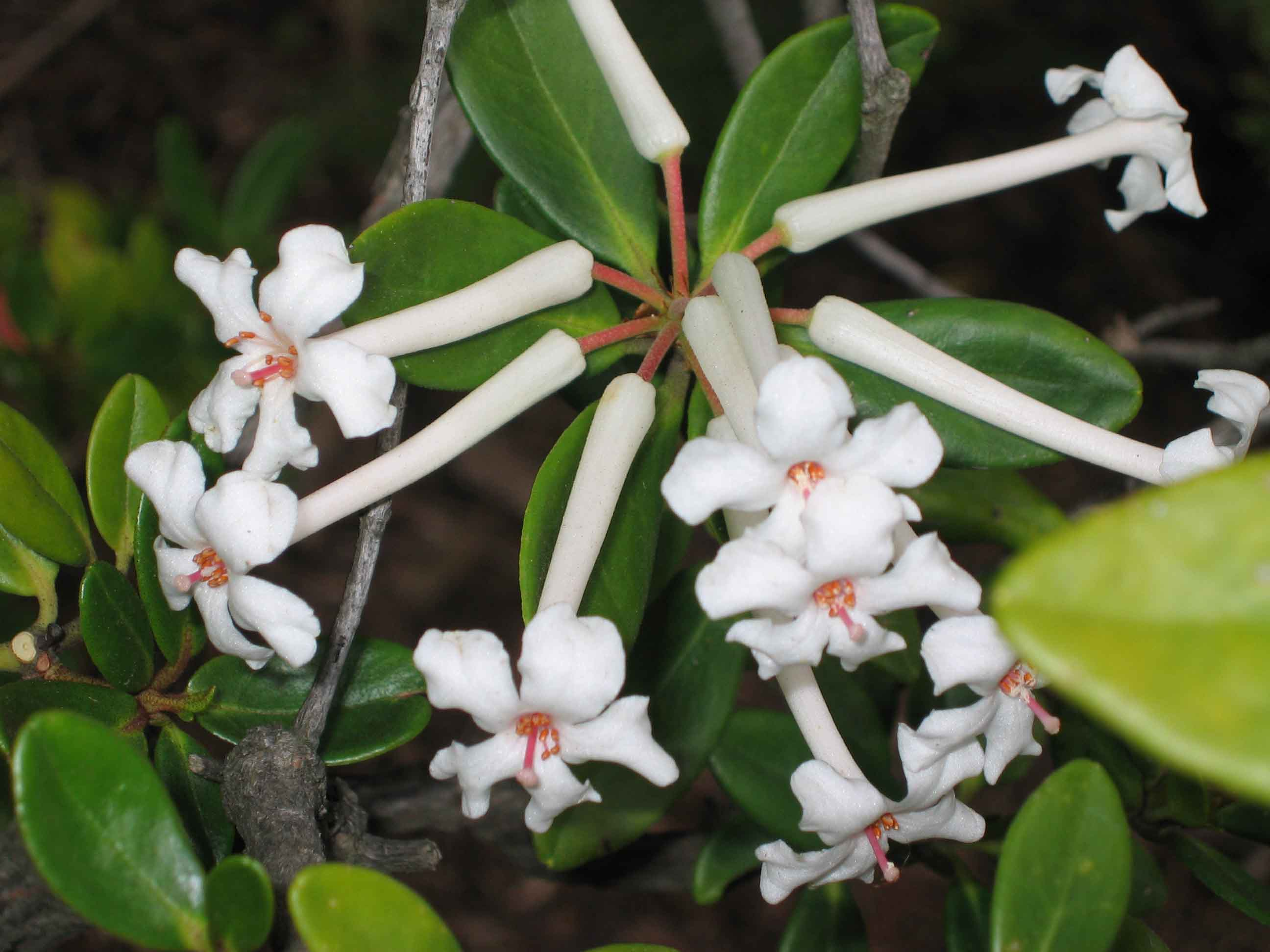

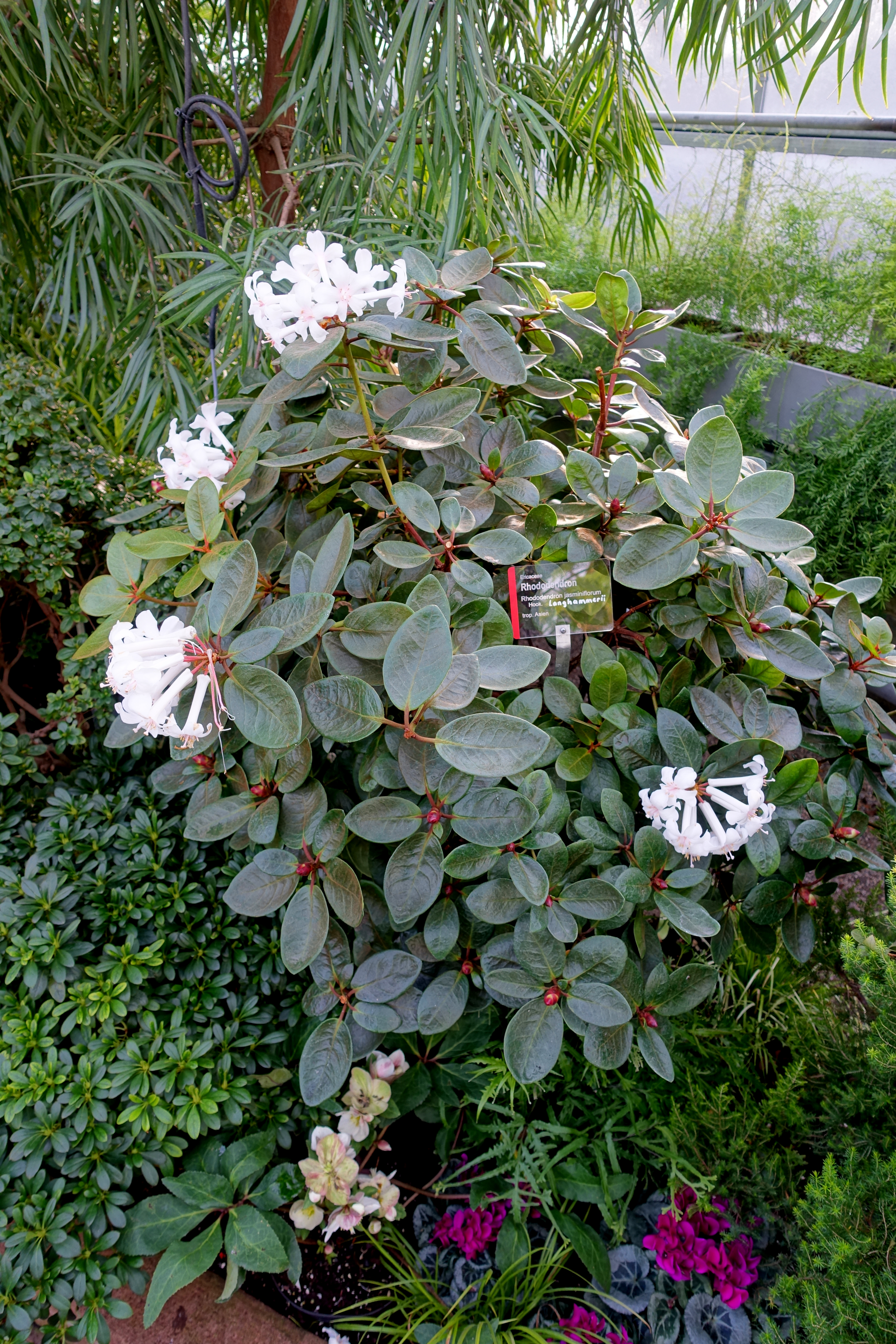
