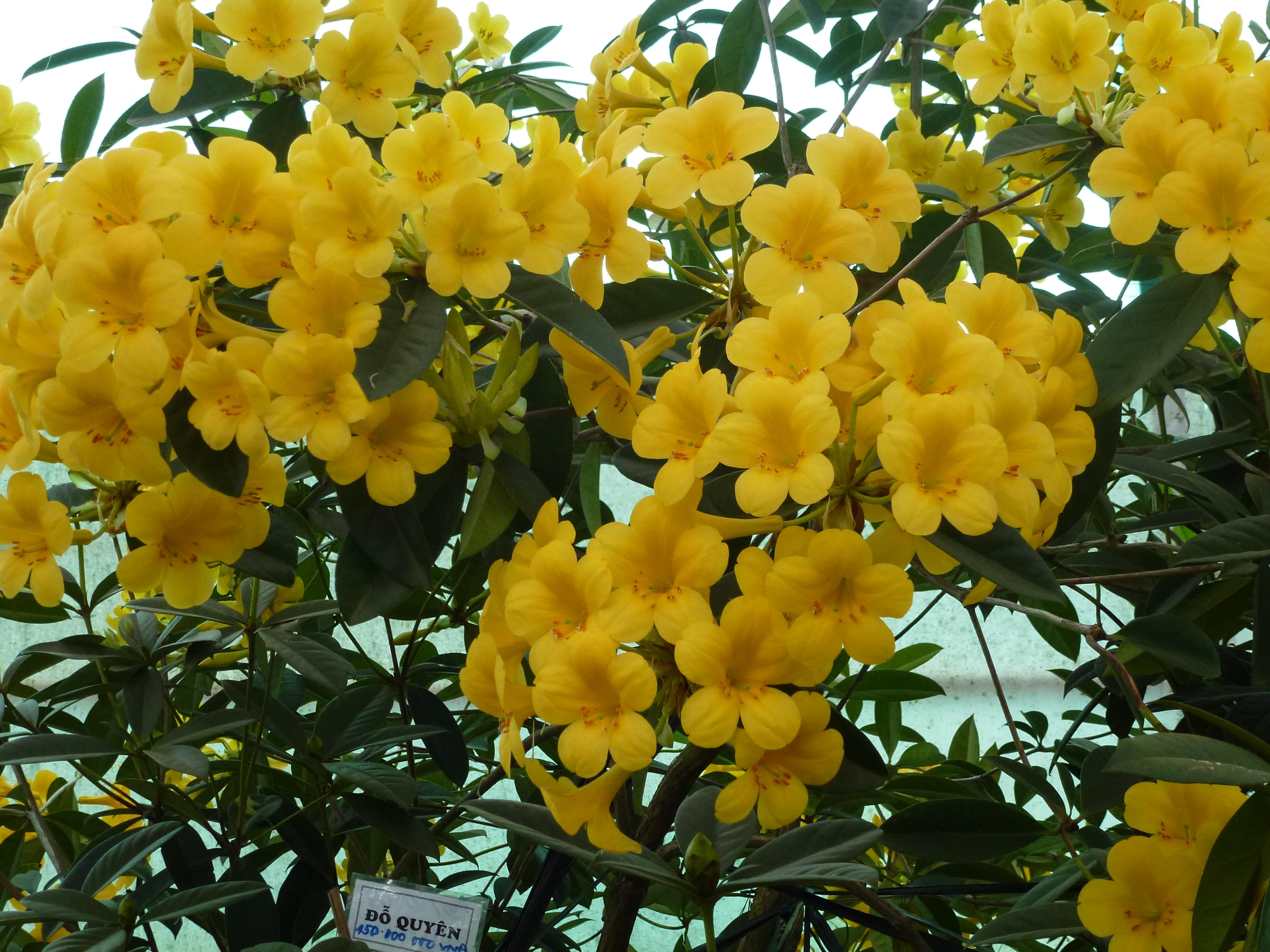

Scientific classification
- Kingdom: Plantae
- Clade: Tracheophytes
- Clade: Angiosperms
- Clade: Eudicots
- Clade: Asterids
- Order: Ericales
- Family: Ericaceae
- Genus: Rhododendron
- Species: R. laetum

Binomial name
- Rhododendron laetum J.J.Sm.

Synonyms
- Rhododendron uliginosum

= Rhododendron laetum =

Species of flower

Rhododendron laetum is a rhododendron species native to the Anggi Lakes area of the Arfak Mountains in Indonesia and western New Guinea, where it grows at forest edges, in open marsh, and in swamps at the edge of lakes. This evergreen shrub grows to 3 m (9.8 ft) in height, with leaves that are broadly elliptic or sub-ovate-elliptic, 40–95 × 25–53 mm in size. The flowers are deep yellow, flushing with red or orange as they age.
