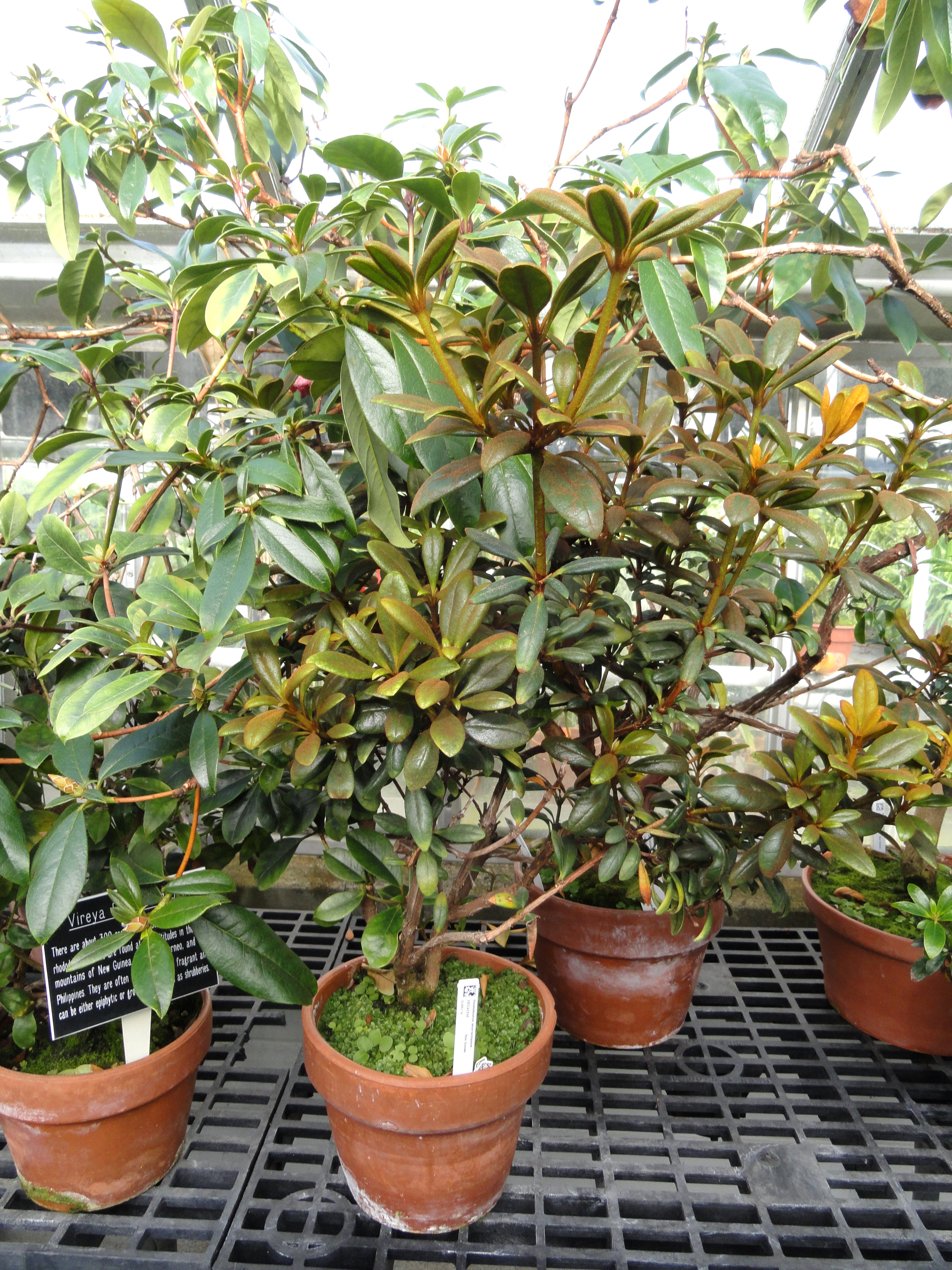

Conservation status
- Least Concern (IUCN 3.1)

Scientific classification
- Kingdom: Plantae
- Clade: Tracheophytes
- Clade: Angiosperms
- Clade: Eudicots
- Clade: Asterids
- Order: Ericales
- Family: Ericaceae
- Genus: Rhododendron
- Species: R. beyerinckianum

Binomial name
- Rhododendron beyerinckianum Koord.

Synonyms
- Rhododendron chrysopeplon Sleumer; Rhododendron dasylepis Schltr.; Rhododendron saavedranum Diels; Rhododendron schulzei Schltr.

= Rhododendron beyerinckianum =

Species of plant

Rhododendron beyerinckianum is a species of rhododendron endemic to New Guinea.

== Habitat ==
It is found in the Indonesian portion of the island and western Papua New Guinea, extending as far east as Mount Victoria and Mount Dayman, where it grows at elevations of 1400–4000 meters.

== Description ==
It is a shrub that grows to 5 m in height, with leathery leaves that are narrowly ovate, 6 x 3.5 cm in size. Flowers are tubular-funnel-shaped and usually dark red, but also white, yellow, greenish or pink.
