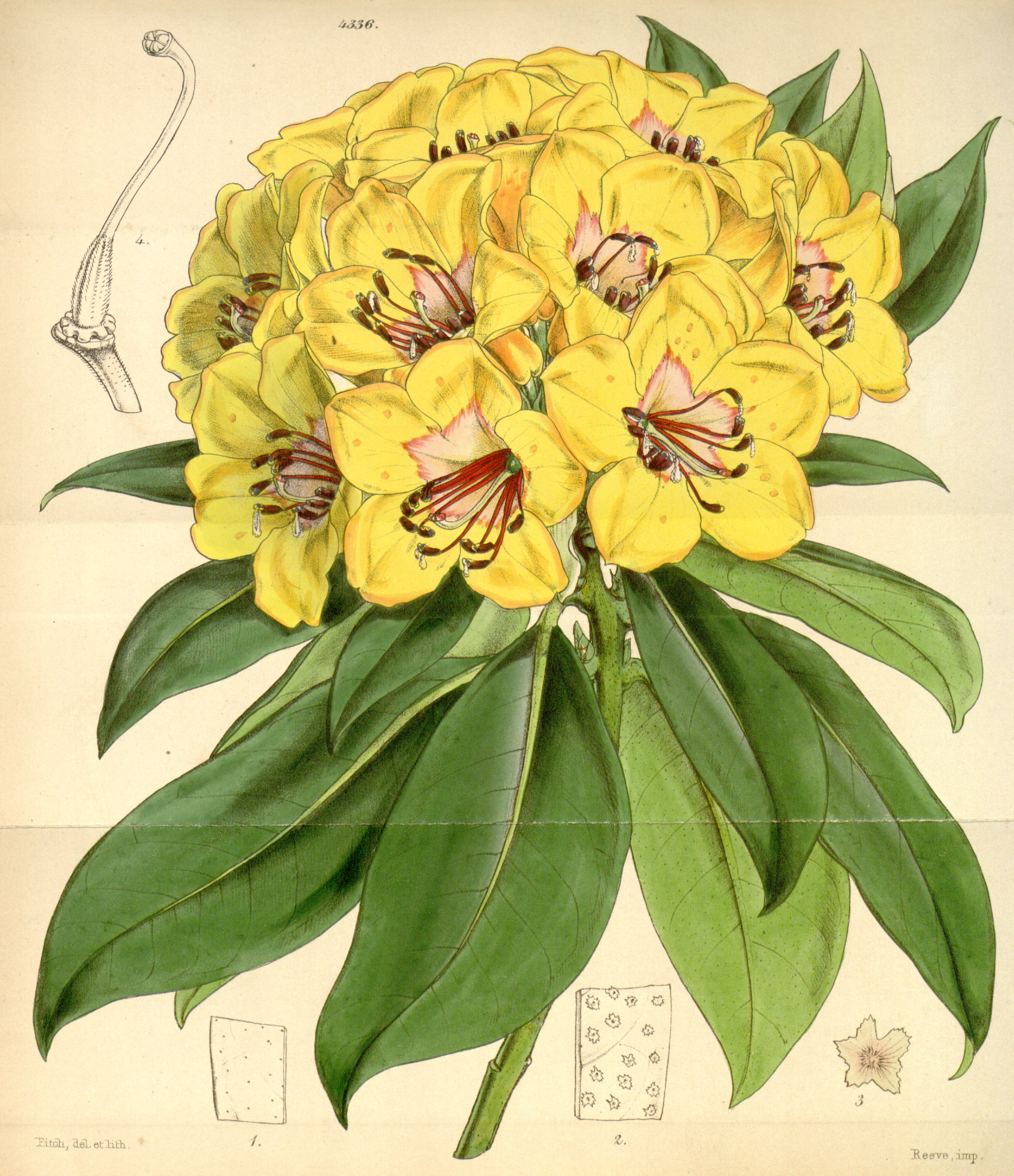

Scientific classification
- Kingdom: Plantae
- Clade: Tracheophytes
- Clade: Angiosperms
- Clade: Eudicots
- Clade: Asterids
- Order: Ericales
- Family: Ericaceae
- Genus: Rhododendron
- Species: R. javanicum

Binomial name
- Rhododendron javanicum (Blume) Benn.

Synonyms
- Azalea javanica (Blume) Kuntze; Rhododendron brookeanum Low ex Lindl.; Vireya javanica Blume.

= Rhododendron javanicum =

Species of plant

Rhododendron javanicum is a rhododendron species native to Indonesia, Malaysia, and the Philippines. This evergreen shrub grows to 5 m (16 ft) with bright orange flowers in spring. Plants may be terrestrial or epiphytic. Some forms from the Philippines may have red or bicoloured flowers, but are less often seen in cultivation.

== Subspecies ==
Nine subspecies are recognized:

- Rhododendron javanicum subsp. brookeanum (H.Low ex Lindl.) Argent & Phillipps – epiphytic shrub or tree, Borneo
- Rhododendron javanicum subsp. cladotrichum (Sleumer) Argent – epiphytic shrub, Borneo (Sabah and east-central Kalimantan)
- Rhododendron javanicum subsp. gracile (H.Low ex Lindl.) Argent, A.Lamb & Phillipps – epiphytic shrub, Borneo
- Rhododendron javanicum subsp. javanicum – hemiepiphytic shrub or small tree, Sumatra, Java, Borneo, and the Lesser Sunda Islands
- Rhododendron javanicum subsp. kinabaluense (Argent, A.Lamb & Phillipps) Argent – hemiepiphytic shrub, Borneo (Sabah)
- Rhododendron javanicum subsp. moultonii (Ridl.) Argent – epiphytic shrub, Sabah and Sarawak
- Rhododendron javanicum subsp. palawanense Argent – epiphytic shrub, Philippines (Palawan)
- Rhododendron javanicum subsp. schadenbergii (Warb.) Argent – epiphytic shrub, Philippines and northeastern Sulawesi
- Rhododendron javanicum subsp. teysmannii (Miq.) Argent – epiphytic shrub, Peninsular Malaysia, Sumatra, Java, and Lesser Sunda Islands
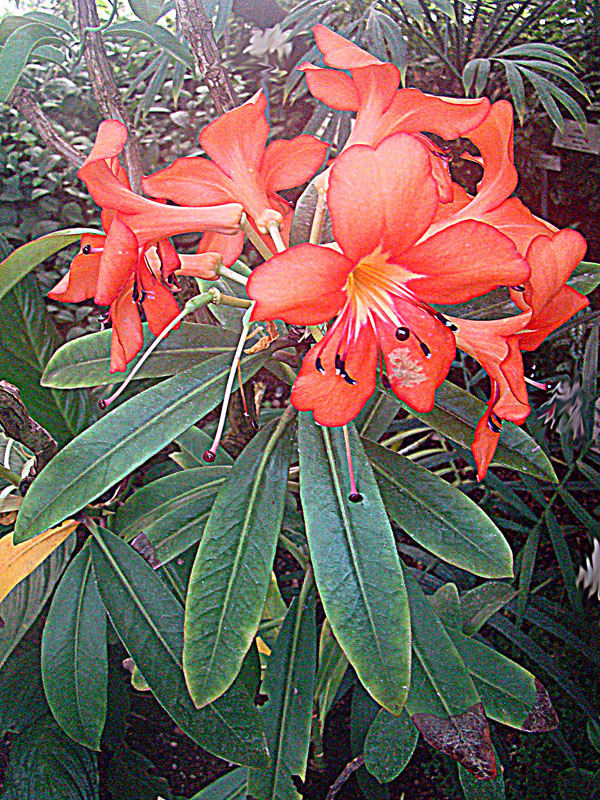
R. javanicum subsp. brookeanum

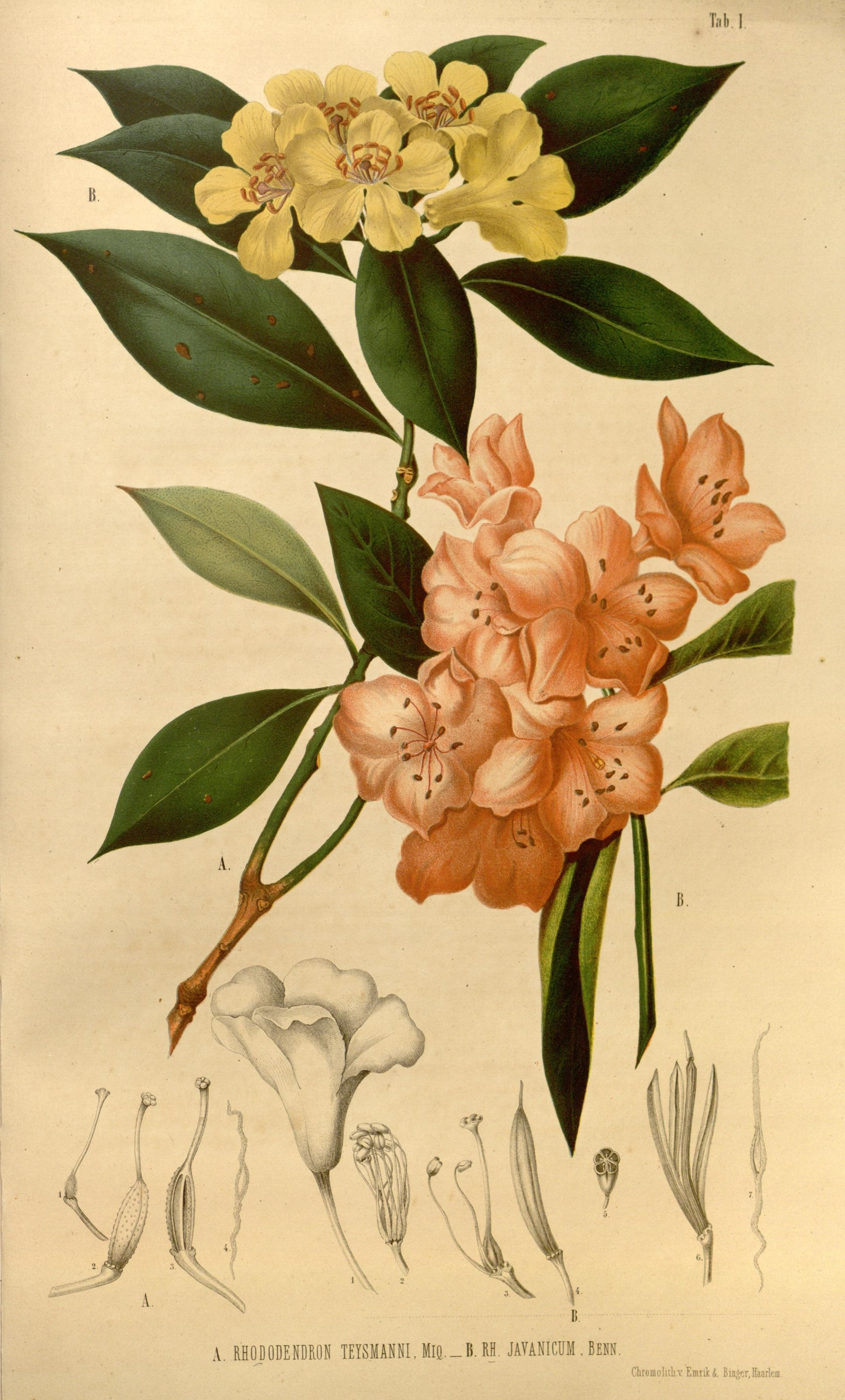
Left image R. javaicum subsp. teysmanni
