= Rhododendron album =

Conservation status
- Vulnerable (IUCN 2.3)

Scientific classification
- Kingdom: Plantae
- Clade: Tracheophytes
- Clade: Angiosperms
- Clade: Eudicots
- Clade: Asterids
- Order: Ericales
- Family: Ericaceae
- Genus: Rhododendron
- Species: R. album

Binomial name
- Rhododendron album Blume

Species of plant

Rhododendron album is a species of plant in the family Ericaceae. It is endemic to Java in Indonesia. It is a vulnerable species threatened by habitat loss.

== Description ==
Rhododendron album is white, but can also appear lilac, depending on the hybrid. The stamen is often a different color, such as orange or pink. The flower is four to six inches (10 to 15 cm) high, and blooms in the spring, staying green throughout autumn. (Bay Science Foundation, 2008)

In 1998, Rhododendron album was deemed vulnerable by the World Conservation Monitoring Centre, meaning that it faces a high risk of extinction in the mid-term future unless proper conservation methods are employed.

Rhododendron album is native to Java (Indonesian Jawa), Indonesia. It is mostly found in the increasingly smaller high elevation forests throughout western and central Java.

== Threats ==
=== Habitat loss ===
Rhododendron album is threatened by habitat loss. The habitat loss is due to agriculture, extraction of trees and other species of plants, as well as expansion of infrastructure throughout Java's forests. The degradation of Java's forests is more intense in lower elevations, but higher elevations where the plant grows are also affected.

Most of Java's forests have been cleared, and what is left is generally located in mountainous areas. The forests are legally protected, although locals continue to extract trees for timber and firewood, and many depend on the trees for their livelihood. Tree cutting in many places in Java has changed the forest to the point that large parts of former forest are now covered with shrubs, and forest degradation, especially as a result of tree cutting, is widespread throughout.

In order to save the species, more education and a stricter enforcement of the law against tree cutting is required. The Indonesian government must also reach an agreement with locals in Java, as the local's livelihoods often depend on the wood from the trees of these forests.

== Uses and stakeholders ==
Rhododendron album is grown widely in nurseries throughout the world, especially in the United States. Much research has been done developing hybrids with high aesthetic value. One of the earliest hybrids created was the Rhododendron cawtawbiense var. album, known as the Catawba album. It was bred in 1886 by Anthony Waterer, an early hybridizer.

Besides maintaining biodiversity, Rhododendron album is important for its aesthetic value. Rhododendron album, along with the many other variations and hybrids, are popular plants in the landscaping industry, and are used for a variety of decorations, including wedding and special occasion bouquets, corsages, and other floral arrangements.

== Diseases and research ==
Although nurseries have contributed to the continued survival of the plant, they have not been able to save all of them, and there have been outbreaks of disease. These diseases, caused by various bacteria and fungi, have been severe and widespread.

Pseudomonas cichorii In 1995, the bacteria Pseudomonas cichorii was discovered on container-grown rhododendrons in a nursery in Georgia, USA. The spots were at first very small, one to five millimeters in diameter, but soon grew into large, reddish brown blotches.

Phytophthora ramorum In 2002 and 2003, studies in nurseries throughout California and Oregon tested for Phytophthora ramorum. The symptoms of the disease were large necrotic spots with water soaked outside borders and rust colored centers. Symptomatic plants were collected, and DNA was extracted from the spots. After amplifying it with a PCR assay, GenBank matched the DNA to that of Phytophthora ramorum and P. lateralis. In 2004, Rhododendron leaves with similar symptoms were studied and showed the host range of P. hibernalis as well.

In a test of the susceptibility of five different types of Rhododendron to P. ramorum, samples were exposed to a zoospore suspension and left in a moist environment for 10 days. Measurements taken after the incubation period showed differences in susceptibility between the five types. Catawbiense album, the only variation of R. album used in the study, was found to be more susceptible than three of the other types of rhododendron.

Tissue Proliferation Tissue proliferation is another disorder Rhododendron album has encountered in nurseries. It was first found in the mid-1980s and is characterized by tumor like growths. These growths are usually towards the bottom of the stem, but can be above or below the soil line.

When first discovered, there was worry among nursery owners and growers. It is now thought that the disease is caused by Agrobacterium tumefaciens. Researchers have been working to isolate the bacteria, and also have asked for help from nurseries and growers in looking for links to possible causes. At least 15 states, along with Canada and the U.K. have reported cases of tissue proliferation.

Breeding cycle and repopulation Steps are being taken towards saving and repopulating the plant. In 1955, researchers attempted to shorten the breeding cycle of the Rhododendron catawbiense album. They knew that if dormant buds of R. catawbiense album were dormant for too long, they were subject to breakage. They found that when keeping the plants at between 15 and 20 degrees Celsius, the number of growth periods was increased, and the speed of growth in many of the plants was twice that of a natural day. When applied to seedlings, this treatment cut the time taken to flower in half.
