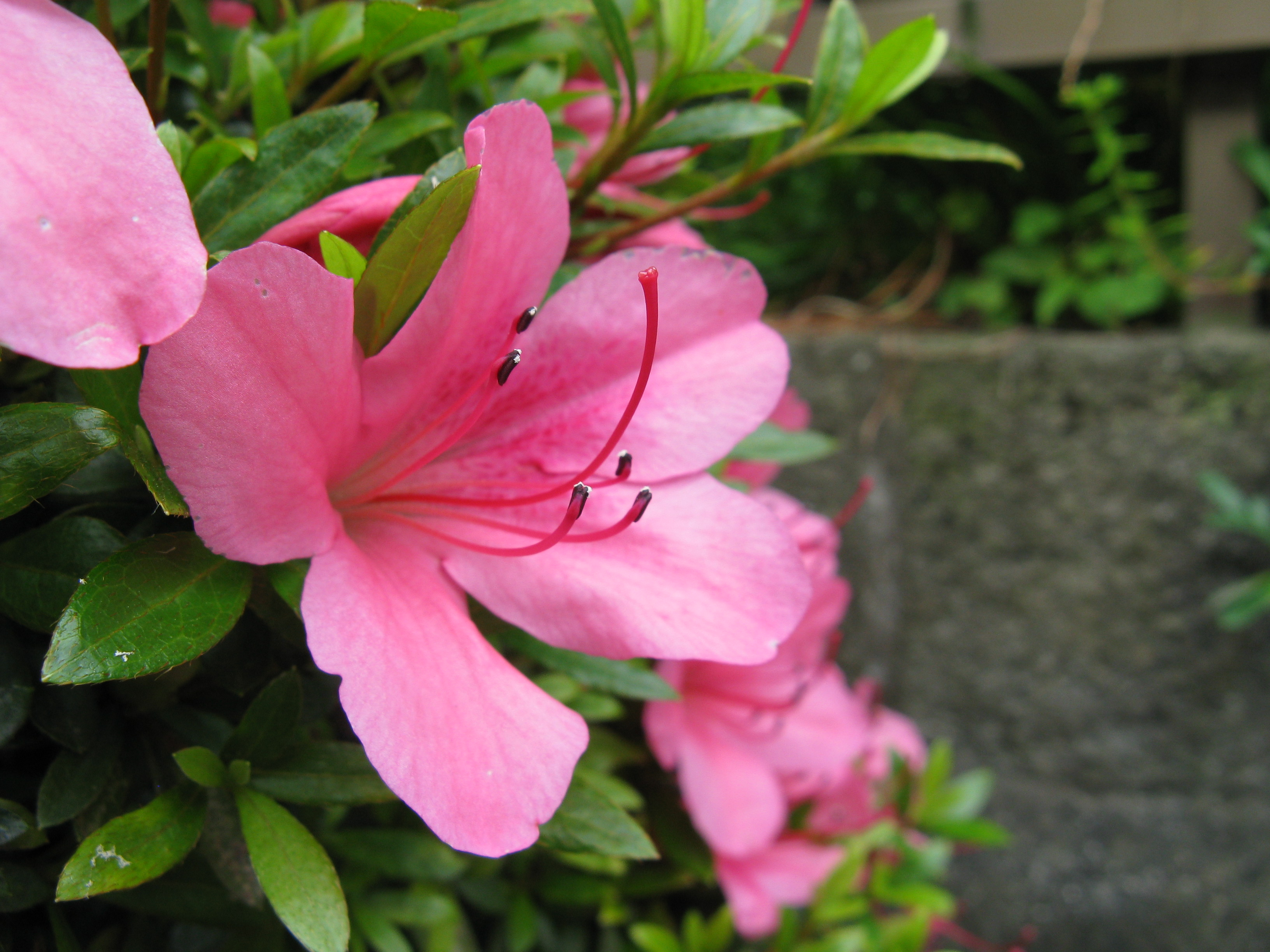
- Rhododendron indicum

Scientific classification
- Kingdom: Plantae
- Clade: Embryophytes
- Clade: Tracheophytes
- Clade: Spermatophytes
- Clade: Angiosperms
- Clade: Eudicots
- Clade: Asterids
- Order: Ericales
- Family: Ericaceae
- Genus: Rhododendron
- Subgenus: Rhododendron subg. Azaleastrum
- Section: Rhododendron sect. Tsutsusi
- Subsection: Rhododendron subsect. Tsutsusi; Sweet

Type species
- Rhododendron indicum (L.) Sweet

Species
- See text

= Rhododendron subsect. Tsutsusi =

Group of shrubs

Rhododendron subsection Tsutsusi is a subsection of the genus Rhododendron, in section Tsutsusi, subgenus Azaleastrum, consisting of 66 species of Azaleas.

== Description ==
Leaves generally deciduous but some apical leaves over winter and are dimorphic, young twigs with flattened multicellular hairs that are widely distributed.

== Taxonomy ==
For etymology, see section Tsutsusi.

=== Species ===
Species include;

Image	Name	Distribution
	Rhododendron adenanthum M.Y.He 1984	China (Guangxi)
	Rhododendron adenobracteum X.F.Gao & Y.L.Peng 2004	China (Sichuan)
	Rhododendron arunachalense D.F.Chamb. & Rae 1990	India (Arunachal Pradesh )
	Rhododendron boninense Nakai 1920	Japan ( Ogasawara-shoto)
	Rhododendron breviperulatum Hayata 1913	Taiwan
	Rhododendron chaoanense D.C.Wu & P.C.Tam 1978	China (Guangdong)
	Rhododendron chrysocalyx H.Lév. & Vaniot 1906	China (Hubei, Guizhou, Guangxi)
	Rhododendron chunii W.P.Fang 1984	China (Guangdong, Guangxi), Vietnam
	Rhododendron crassimedium P.C.Tam 1982	China (Jiangxi)
	Rhododendron crassistylum M.Y.He 1987	China (Jiangxi)
	Rhododendron cretaceum P.C.Tam 1983	China (Guangdong)
	Rhododendron eriocarpum (Hayata) Nakai 1922	Japan (Kyushu) to Nansei-shoto (Uotsuri-Jima)
	Rhododendron flosculum W.P.Fang & G.Z.Li 1984	China (Guangxi)
	Rhododendron flumineum W.P.Fang & M.Y.He 1982	China (Yunnan)
	Rhododendron fuchsiifolium H.Lév. 1914	China (Guizhou, Guangxi, Guangdong)
	Rhododendron fuscipilum M.Y.He 1984	China (Guangxi)
	Rhododendron guizhongense G.Z.Li 1995	China (Guangxi)
	Rhododendron hainanense Merr. 1922	China (Guangxi), Vietnam
	Rhododendron hunanense Chun & P.C.Tam 1982	China (E. Jiangxi, S. Hunan)
	Rhododendron indicum (L.) Sweet 1830	Japan (W. & Central Honshu, Kyushu)
	Rhododendron jasminoides M.Y.He 1984	China (Guangxi)
	Rhododendron jinpingense W.P.Fang & M.Y.He 1982	China (Yunnan)
	Rhododendron jinxiuense W.P.Fang & M.Y.He 1982	China (Guangxi)
	Rhododendron kaempferi Planch. 1853	Japan
	Rhododendron kanehirae E.H.Wilson 1921	Taiwan
	Rhododendron kiusianum Makino 1914	Japan (Kyushu)
	Rhododendron komiyamae Makino 1925	Japan (Shizuoka)
	Rhododendron kwangsiense Hu ex P.C.Tam 1983	China (Guangxi, Guangdong, Hunan, Guizhou)
	Rhododendron kwangtungense Merr. & Chun 1930	China (Guangxi, Guangdong, Hunan, Guizhou)
	Rhododendron lasiostylum Hayata 1913	Taiwan
	Rhododendron lilacinum Xiang Chen & X.Chen 2010	China (Guizhou)
	Rhododendron linguiense G.Z.Li 1995	China (Guangxi).
	Rhododendron litchiifolium T.C.Wu & P.C.Tam 1978	China (Guangdong).
	Rhododendron longifalcatum P.C.Tam 1982	China (Guangxi)
	Rhododendron longiperulatum Hayata 1913	Taiwan
	Rhododendron loniceriflorum P.C.Tam 1982	China (Fujian)
	Rhododendron malipoense M.Y.He 1984	China (Yunnan)
	Rhododendron mariae Hance 1882	China (Guizhou)
	Rhododendron meridionale P.C.Tam 1982	China (Guangxi), Vietnam
	Rhododendron microphyton Franch. 1886	China (Guangxi), Myanmar, Thailand
	Rhododendron minutiflorum Hu 1931	China (Guangxi, Guangdong)
	Rhododendron mucronatum (Blume) G.Don 1834	Japan
	Rhododendron myrsinifolium Ching ex W.P.Fang & M.Y.He 1982	China (Guangxi)
	Rhododendron naamkwanense Merr. 1934	China (Guangdong, Jiangxi)
	Rhododendron nakaharae Hayata 1908	northern Taiwan
	Rhododendron nanpingense P.C.Tam 1982	China (Fujian)
	Rhododendron nipponicum Mastsum. 1899	Japan (Honshu)
	Rhododendron noriakianum T.Suzuki 1935	Taiwan
	Rhododendron octandrum M.Y.He 1987	China (Guizhou)
	Rhododendron oldhamii Maxim. 1871	Taiwan
	Rhododendron pinetorum P.C.Tam 1982	China (Hunan)
	Rhododendron pudingense X.Y.Dai, C.H.Yang & Y.P.Ma 2020	China (Guizhou)
	Rhododendron pulchroides Chun & W.P.Fang 1957	China (Guangxi)
	Rhododendron qianyangense M.Y.He 1985	China (Hunan)
	Rhododendron rhodanthum M.Y.He 1985	China (Hunan)
	Rhododendron rhuyuenense Chun ex P.C.Tam 1983	China (Hunan, Guangdong, Jiangxi)
	Rhododendron ripense Makino 1908	Japan
	Rhododendron rivulare Hand.-Mazz. 1921	China, N. Myanmar
	Rhododendron rubropilosum Hayata 1911	Central Taiwan
	Rhododendron rufohirtum Hand.-Mazz. 1921	China (Sichuan, Yunnan, Guizhou)
	Rhododendron saxatile B.Y.Ding & Y.Y.Fang 1987	China (Zhejiang)
	Rhododendron saxicola Sleumer 1958	Vietnam
	Rhododendron scabrum G.Don 1834	Nansei-shoto
	Rhododendron seniavinii Maxim. 1871	China (Guizhou, Hunan, Jiangxi, Fujian)
	Rhododendron serpyllifolium (A.Gray) Miq. 1866	Japan(Honshu, Kyushu, and Shikoku,)
	Rhododendron sikayotaizanense Masam. 1939	Taiwan
	Rhododendron simsii Planch. 1853	China, Laos, Myanmar, Nansei-shoto, Taiwan, Thailand, Tibet, Vietnam
	Rhododendron sohayakiense Y.Watan & T.Yukawa 2019	Japan (Honshu, Shikoku)
	Rhododendron sparsifolium W.P.Fang 1983	China (Sichuan)
	Rhododendron stenopetalum (R.Hogg) Mabb. 1990	Japan
	Rhododendron strigosum R.L.Liu 2001	China (Jiangxi)
	Rhododendron subcerinum P.C.Tam 1982	China (Guangdong)
	Rhododendron subenerve P.C.Tam 1983	China (Guangxi)
	Rhododendron subflumineum P.C.Tam 1982	China (Hunan, Guangdong)
	Rhododendron subsessile Rendle 1896	Philippines.
	Rhododendron taipaoense T.C.Wu & P.C.Tam 1978	China (Guangdong, Fujian).
	Rhododendron taiwanalpinum Ohwi 1937	Taiwan
	Rhododendron tashiroi Maxim. 1886	Japan, Taiwan
	Rhododendron tenuilaminare P.C.Tam 1983	China (Guangdong)
	Rhododendron tingwuense P.C.Tam 1978	China (Guangdong)
	Rhododendron tosaense Makino 1892	Japan (SW. Honshu, S. Shikoku, E. Kyushu)
	Rhododendron tschonoskii Maxim. 1870	Japan, Kuril Is., Sakhalin
	Rhododendron tsusiophyllum Sugim. 1956	Japan
	Rhododendron unciferum P.C.Tam 1982	China (Guangxi)
	Rhododendron viscidum C.Z.Guo & Z.H.Liu 1988	China (Hunan)
	Rhododendron xiangganense X.F.Jin & B.Y.Ding 2009	China (Jiangxi, Hunan)
	Rhododendron yakuinsulare Masam. 1930	Japan (Yakushima)
	Rhododendron yangmingshanense P.C.Tam 1982	China (Hunan)
	Rhododendron yaoshanicum W.P.Fang & M.Y.He 1983	China (Guangxi)
	Rhododendron yedoense Maxim. ex Regel 1886	China (Yunnan) to N. Myanmar, Korea, S. Japan
	Rhododendron yunyianum X.F.Jin & B.Y.Ding 2009	China (Fujian)

== Bibliography ==
- Loretta Goetsch, Andrew Eckert and Benjamin Hall. Classification of genus Rhododendron. 2005 Annual ARS Convention
- Chamberlain, DF; Hyam R; Argent G; Fairweather G; Walter KS (1996). The genus Rhododendron: its classification and synonymy. Royal Botanic gardens Edinburgh. ISBN 1-872291-66-X. Archived from the original on July 14, 2014.
- Goetsch, Loretta A.; Eckert, Andrew J.; Hall, Benjamin D. (July–September 2005). "The molecular systematics of Rhododendron (Ericaceae): a phylogeny based upon RPB2 gene sequences". Systematic Botany. 30 (3): 616–626. doi:10.1600/0363644054782170. S2CID 51949019.
- Pojarkova AI, in Schischkin & Bobrov, Flora URSS. 18: 55. 1952.
- Powell, Kron; Ann, E.; Kathleen, A. "Molecular systematics of Rhododendron subgenus Tsutsusi (Rhodoreae, Ericoideae, Ericaceae)". Botany. 2004: 147.
- Chamberlain, DF (1990). "A revision of Rhododendron. IV Subgenus Tsutsusi". Edinburgh Journal of Botany. 47 (2): 89–200. doi:10.1017/S096042860000319X.
- Craven, L.A.; Goetsch, L.A.; Hall, B.D.; Brown, G.K. (2008). "Classification of the Vireya group of Rhododendron (Ericaceae)". Blumea - Biodiversity, Evolution and Biogeography of Plants. 53 (2): 435–442. doi:10.3767/000651908X608070.
- Yue-Jiao, ZHANG; Xiao-Feng, JIN; Bing-Yang, DING; Jing-Ping, ZHU (2009). "Pollen morphology of Rhododendron subgen. Tsutsusi and its systematic implications". Journal of Systematics and Evolution. 47 (2): 123–138. doi:10.1111/j.1759-6831.2009.00011.x. S2CID 86594487.
- Xiao-Feng, Jin; Bing-Yang, Ding; Yue-Jiao, Zhang; De-Yuan, Hong (2010). "A Taxonomic Revision Of Rhododendron subg. Tsutsusi sect. Brachycalyx (Ericaceae)". Annals of the Missouri Botanical Garden. 97 (2): 163–190. doi:10.3417/2007139. S2CID 86507576.
