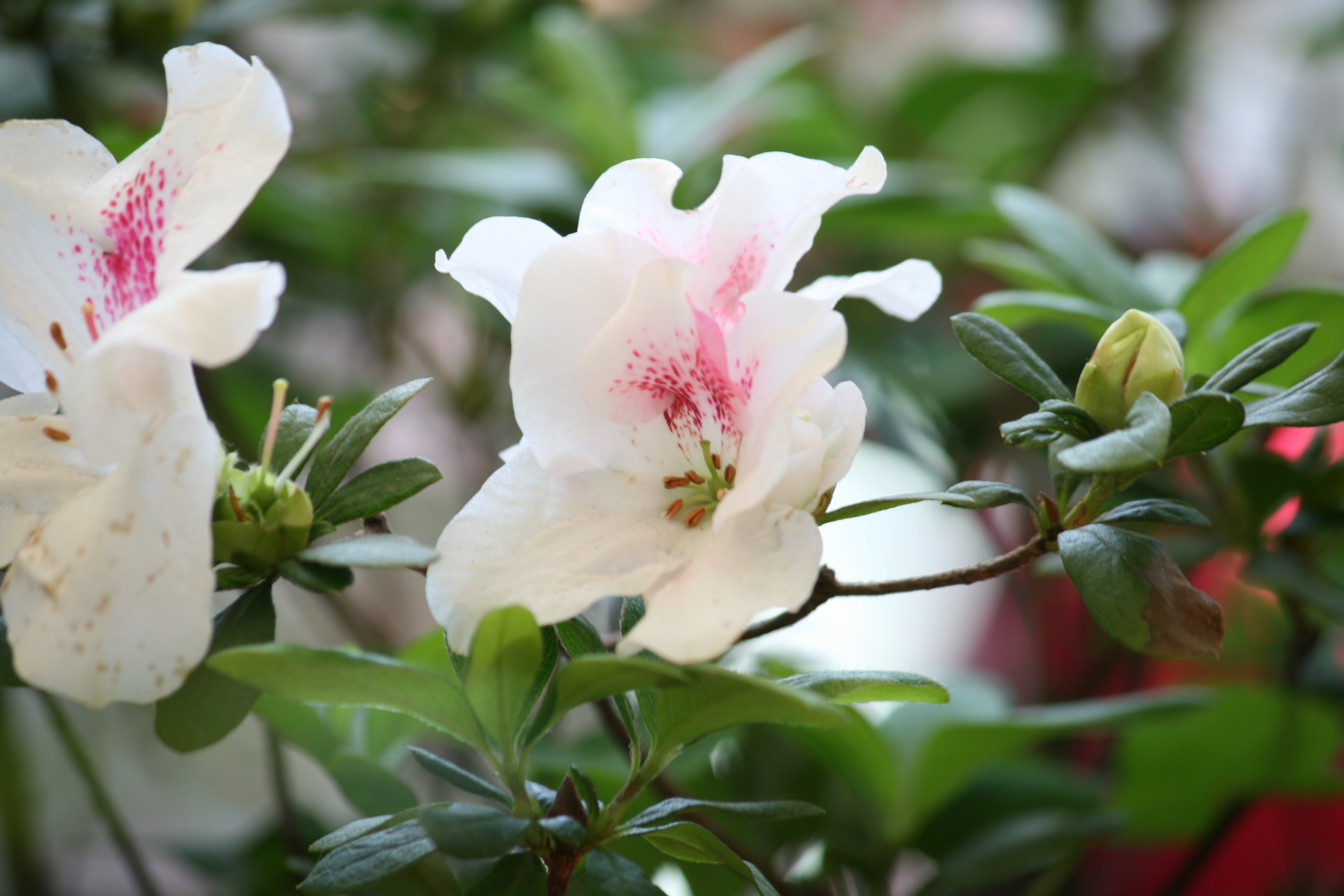
- Rhododendron hongkongense

Scientific classification
- Kingdom: Plantae
- Clade: Tracheophytes
- Clade: Angiosperms
- Clade: Eudicots
- Clade: Asterids
- Order: Ericales
- Family: Ericaceae
- Genus: Rhododendron
- Subgenus: Rhododendron subg. Azaleastrum
- Section: Rhododendron sect. Azaleastrum; Planch. ex Maxim.

Type species
- Rhododendron ovatum

Species
- See text

= Rhododendron sect. Azaleastrum =

Section of rhododendrons

Rhododendron sect. Azaleastrum is a subsection of subgenus Azaleastrum in the genus Rhododendron. It comprises 10 species of deciduous shrubs native to East Asia.

== Species ==
Image	Name	Distribution
	Rhododendron bachii H.Lév. 1913	China (Anhui, Guangdong, Guangxi, Guizhou, Hubei, Hunan, Jiangxi, Sichuan, Zhejiang)
	Rhododendron hangzhouense W.P.Fang & M.Y.He 1982	China (Zhejiang)
	Rhododendron hongkongense Hutch. 1930	China (Guangdong, Hong Kong)
	Rhododendron leptothrium Balf.f. & Forrest	Myanmar, China (Sichuan, Xizang, Yunnan)
	Rhododendron medoense W.P.Fang & M.Y.He 1983	Myanmar, China (Xizang)
	Rhododendron ngawchangense M.N.Philipson & Philipson 1982	Myanmar
	Rhododendron ovatum (Lindl.) Maxim. ex Planch. 1871	China (Anhui, Fujian, Guangdong, Guangxi, Guizhou, Hubei, Hunan, Jiangsu, Jiangxi, Sichuan, Zhejiang.) Taiwan
	Rhododendron tianlinense P.C.Tam 1983	China (Guangxi)
	Rhododendron uwaense H.Hara & T.Yamanaka 1984	Japan (Shikoku)
	Rhododendron vialii Delavay & Franch. 1895	China (Yunnan), Laos, Vietnam
