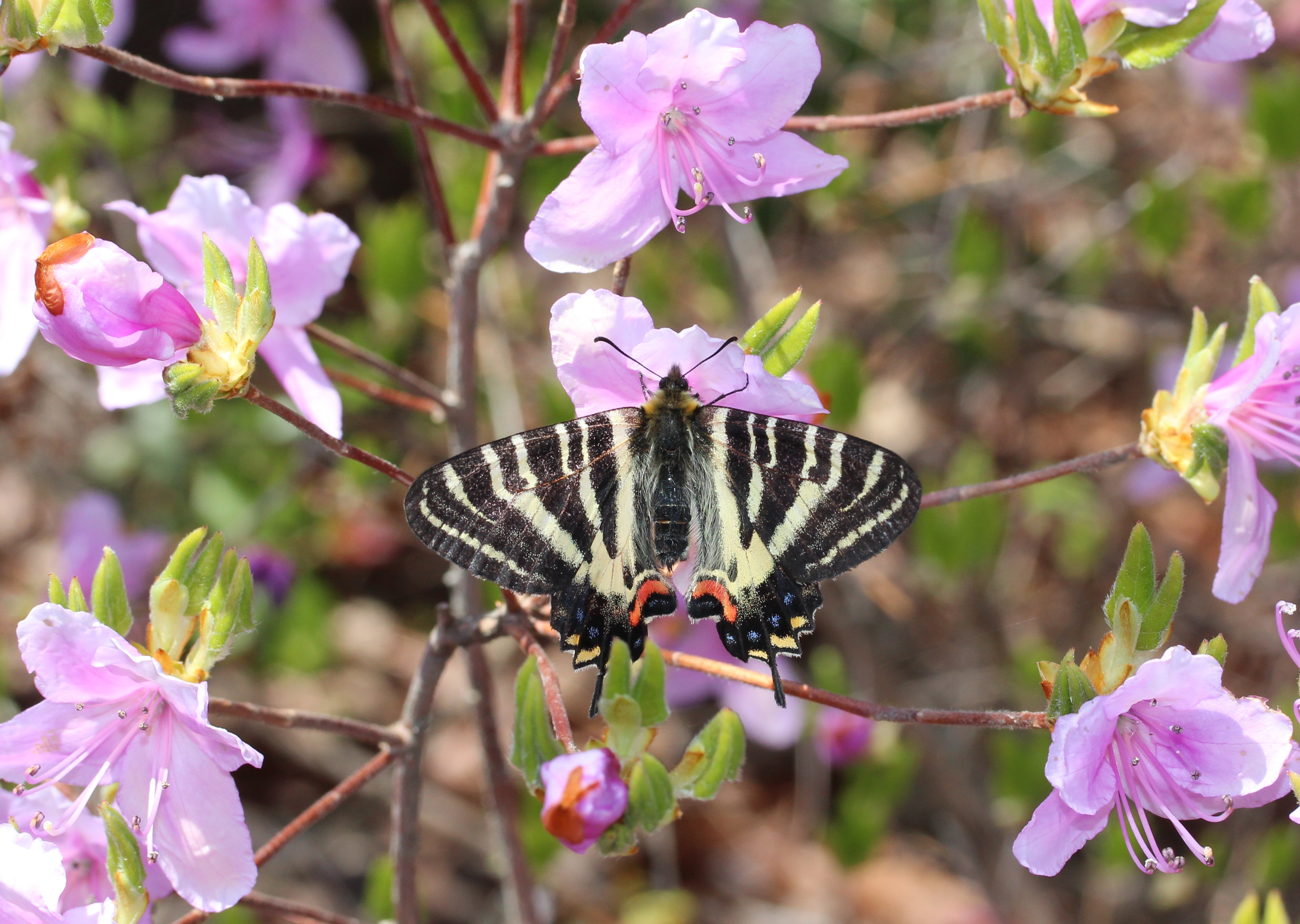
- Rhododendron farrerae

Scientific classification
- Kingdom: Plantae
- Clade: Embryophytes
- Clade: Tracheophytes
- Clade: Spermatophytes
- Clade: Angiosperms
- Clade: Eudicots
- Clade: Asterids
- Order: Ericales
- Family: Ericaceae
- Genus: Rhododendron
- Subgenus: Rhododendron subg. Azaleastrum
- Section: Rhododendron sect. Tsutsusi
- Subsection: Rhododendron subsect. Brachycalyx; Sweet

Type species
- Rhododendron farrerae Sweet

Species
- See text

= Rhododendron subsect. Brachycalyx =

Group of shrubs

Rhododendron subsection Brachycalyx is a subsection of the genus Rhododendron, in section Tsutsusi, subgenus Azaleastrum, consisting of fifteen species of azaleas from Asia.

== Description ==
Leaves deciduous, pseudoverticillate, rhombic, crowded at the shoot apex and monomorphic, hairs usually confined to axils.

== Taxonomy ==
The section Brachcalyx was first proposed by JC Tate based on the Chinese Rhododendron farrerae, and described by Robert Sweet in 1831, in The British Flower Garden.

Species;

Image	Name	Distribution
	Rhododendron amagianum (Makino) Makino ex H.Hara 1948	Japan (C. Honshu)
	Rhododendron dilatatum Miq. 1863	Japan
	Rhododendron farrerae Sweet 1831	S. China.
	Rhododendron hidakanum H.Hara 1974	Japan
	Rhododendron kiyosumense (Makino) Makino 1931	Japan (Honshu)
	Rhododendron lagopus Nakai 1926	Japan (Honshu, Shikoku)
	Rhododendron mariesii Hemsl. & E.H.Wilson 1907	China, Taiwan
	Rhododendron mayebarae Nakai & H.Hara 1935	Japan (Kyushu)
	Rhododendron nudipes Nakai 1926	Japan (Kyushu)
	Rhododendron reticulatum D.Don ex G.Don 1834	Central & S. Japan
	Rhododendron sanctum Nakai 1932	Japan (C. Honshu)
	Rhododendron tashiroi Maxim. 1886	Japan, Nansei-shoto, Taiwan
	Rhododendron viscistylum Nakai 1935	Japan (S. Kyushu)
	Rhododendron wadanum Makino 1917	Japan (C. Honshu)
	Rhododendron weyrichii Maxim. 1871	Japan, Korea

== Bibliography ==
- Loretta Goetsch, Andrew Eckert and Benjamin Hall. Classification of genus Rhododendron. 2005 Annual ARS Convention
- Chamberlain, DF; Hyam R; Argent G; Fairweather G; Walter KS (1996). The genus Rhododendron: its classification and synonymy. Royal Botanic gardens Edinburgh. ISBN 1-872291-66-X. Archived from the original on July 14, 2014.
- Goetsch, Loretta A.; Eckert, Andrew J.; Hall, Benjamin D. (July–September 2005). "The molecular systematics of Rhododendron (Ericaceae): a phylogeny based upon RPB2 gene sequences". Systematic Botany. 30 (3): 616–626. doi:10.1600/0363644054782170. S2CID 51949019.
- Pojarkova AI, in Schischkin & Bobrov, Flora URSS. 18: 55. 1952.
- Powell, Kron; Ann, E.; Kathleen, A. "Molecular systematics of Rhododendron subgenus Tsutsusi (Rhodoreae, Ericoideae, Ericaceae)". Botany. 2004: 147.
- Chamberlain, DF (1990). "A revision of Rhododendron. IV Subgenus Tsutsusi". Edinburgh Journal of Botany. 47 (2): 89–200. doi:10.1017/S096042860000319X.
- Craven, L.A.; Goetsch, L.A.; Hall, B.D.; Brown, G.K. (2008). "Classification of the Vireya group of Rhododendron (Ericaceae)" (PDF). Blumea - Biodiversity, Evolution and Biogeography of Plants. 53 (2): 435–442. doi:10.3767/000651908X608070.
- Yue-Jiao, ZHANG; Xiao-Feng, JIN; Bing-Yang, DING; Jing-Ping (2009). "Rhododendron subgen. Tsutsusi and its systematic implications". Journal of Systematics and Evolution. 47 (2): 123–138. doi:10.1111/j.1759-6831.2009.00011.x. S2CID 86594487.
- Xiao-Feng, Jin; Bing-Yang, Ding; Yue-Jiao, Zhang; De-Yuan, Hong (2010). "A Taxonomic Revision Of Rhododendron subg. Tsutsusi sect. Brachycalyx (Ericaceae)". Annals of the Missouri Botanical Garden. 97 (2): 163–190. doi:10.3417/2007139. S2CID 86507576.
