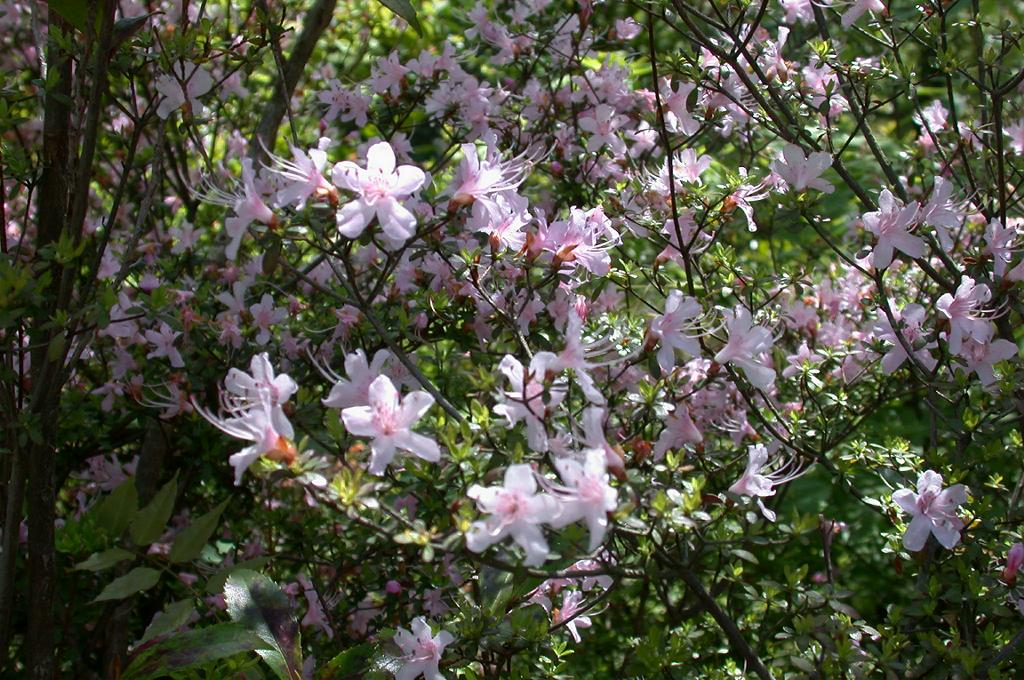

Scientific classification
- Kingdom: Plantae
- Clade: Tracheophytes
- Clade: Angiosperms
- Clade: Eudicots
- Clade: Asterids
- Order: Ericales
- Family: Ericaceae
- Genus: Rhododendron
- Subgenus: Rhododendron subg. Azaleastrum
- Section: Rhododendron sect. Tsutsusi
- Species: R. serpyllifolium

Binomial name
- Rhododendron serpyllifolium (A.Gray) Miq.

Synonyms
- Azalea serpyllifolia A.Gray

= Rhododendron serpyllifolium =

Species of plant

Rhododendron serpyllifolium is a rhododendron species native to Honshu, Kyushu, and Shikoku, Japan. It is placed in section Tsutsusi. It is a shrub that grows to 120 cm (4 ft) in height. Its flowers are white to pink.
