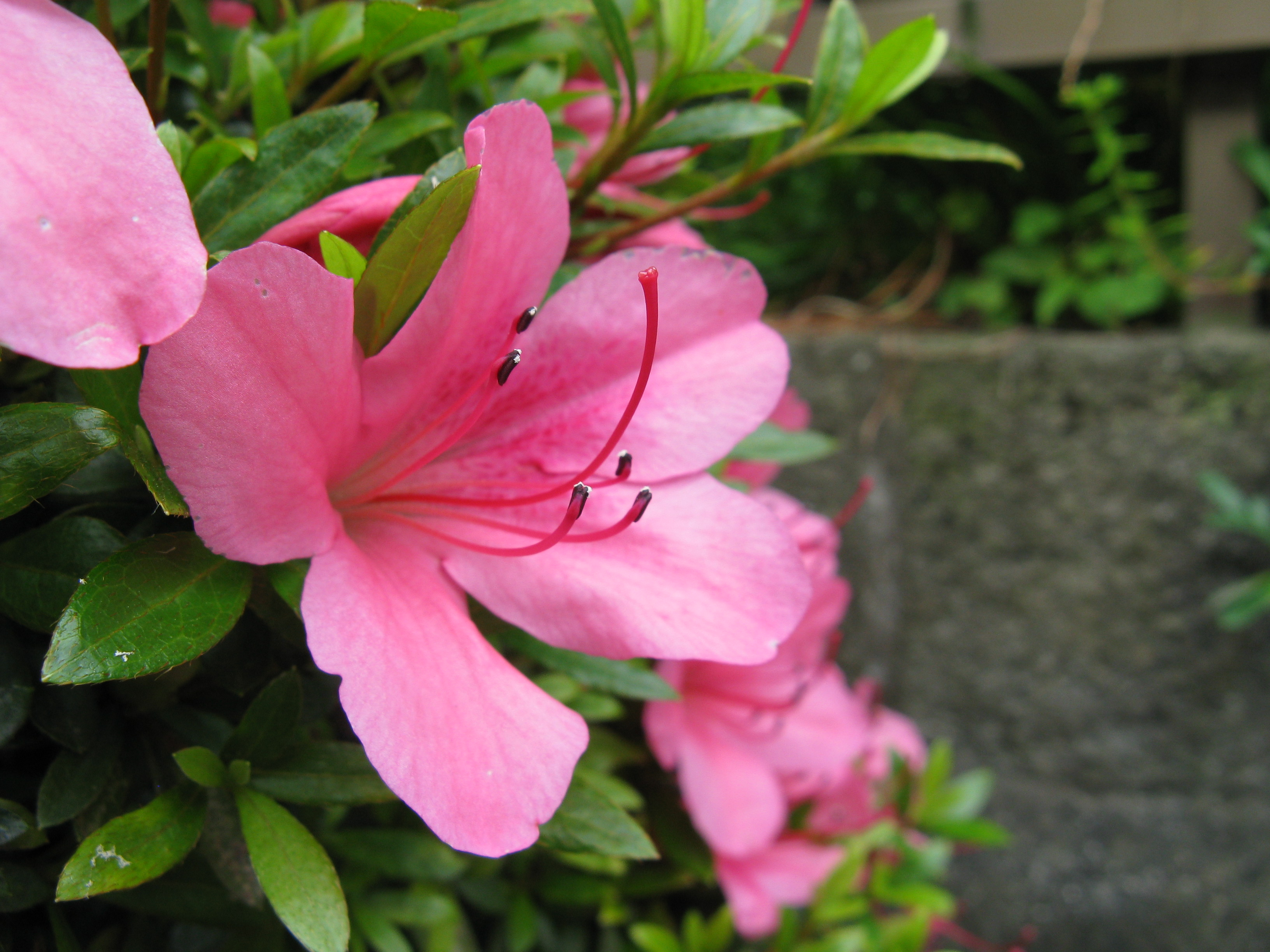

Scientific classification
- Kingdom: Plantae
- Clade: Embryophytes
- Clade: Tracheophytes
- Clade: Angiosperms
- Clade: Eudicots
- Clade: Asterids
- Order: Ericales
- Family: Ericaceae
- Genus: Rhododendron
- Subgenus: Rhododendron subg. Azaleastrum
- Section: Rhododendron sect. Tsutsusi
- Subsection: Rhododendron subsect. Tsutsusi
- Species: R. indicum

Binomial name
- Rhododendron indicum (L.) Sweet

Synonyms
- Azalea indica L.; Rhododendron obtusum (Lindl.) Planch.

= Rhododendron indicum =

Species of plant

Rhododendron indicum is an azalea Rhododendron species native to Japan (S & W Honshu, Shikoku, Kyushu, Yakushima).

== Taxonomy ==
It is the type species for the Tsutsusi section and subsection, and was the original Tsutsusi described by Engelbert Kaempfer in Japan in 1712, from the Japanese name Kirishima-tsutsuji.

== Cultivation ==
There are many cultivars, including the Satsuki azaleas.

== Gallery ==
Immature inflorescence

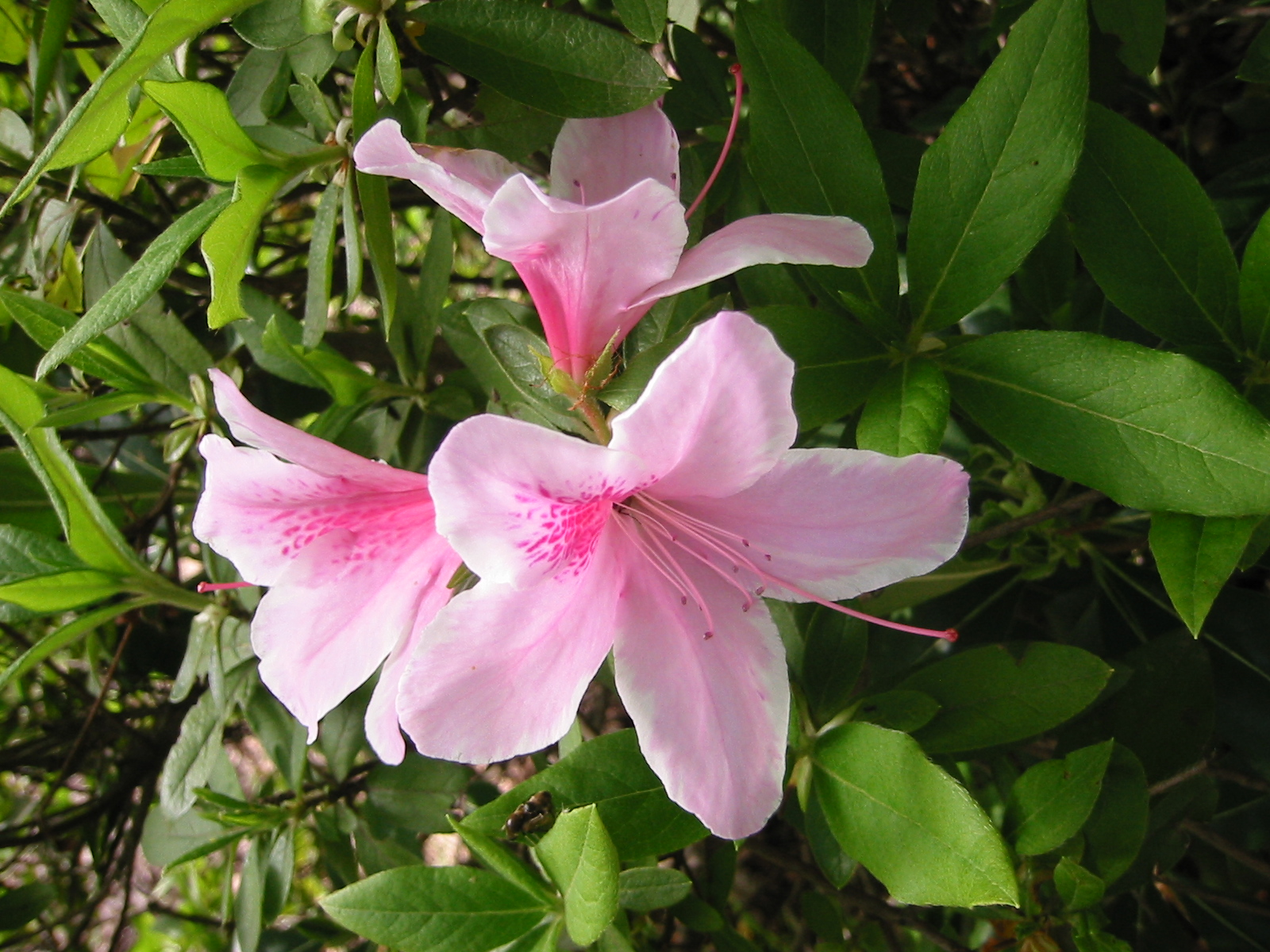
Flower

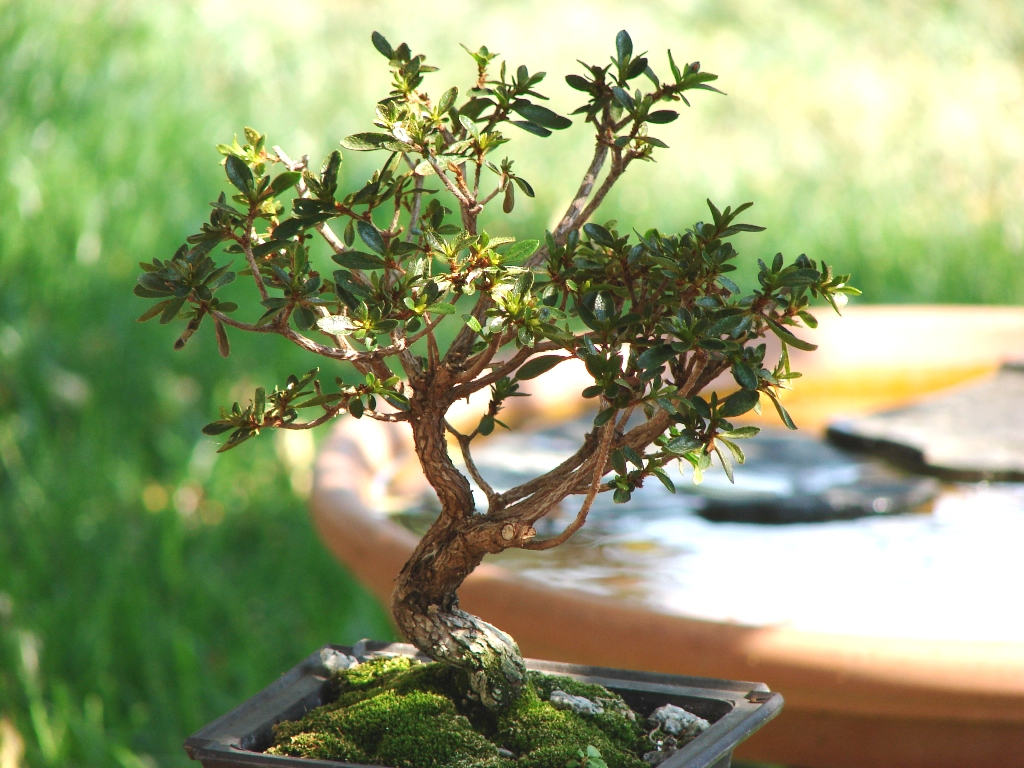
Bonsai

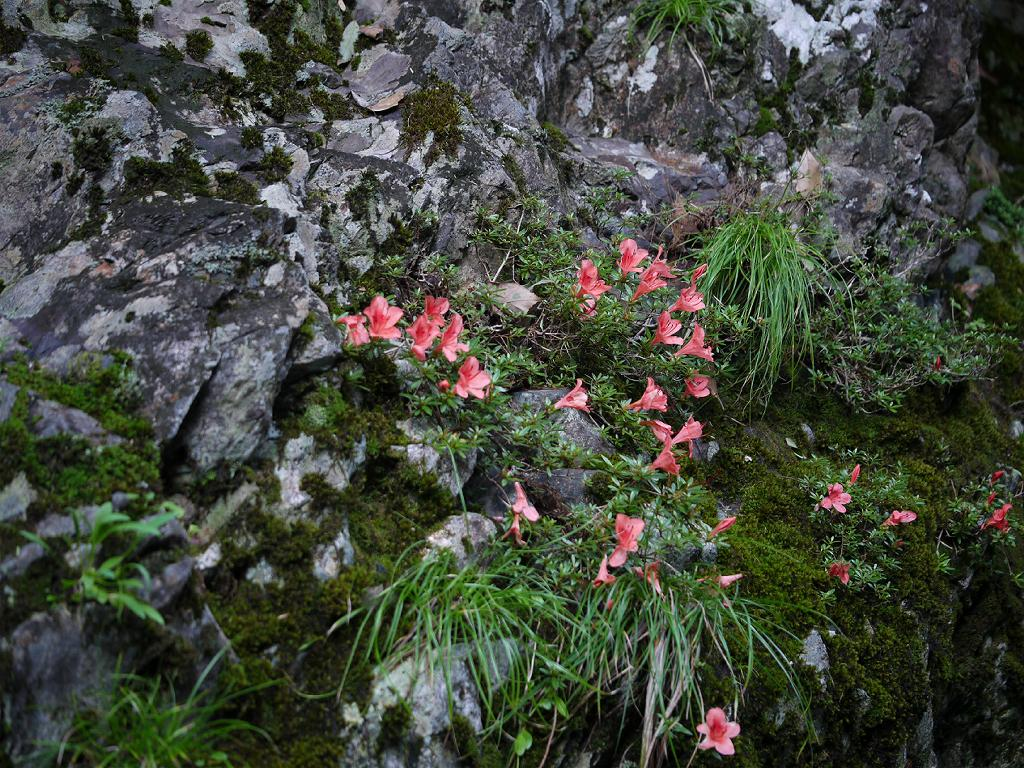
Natural habitat

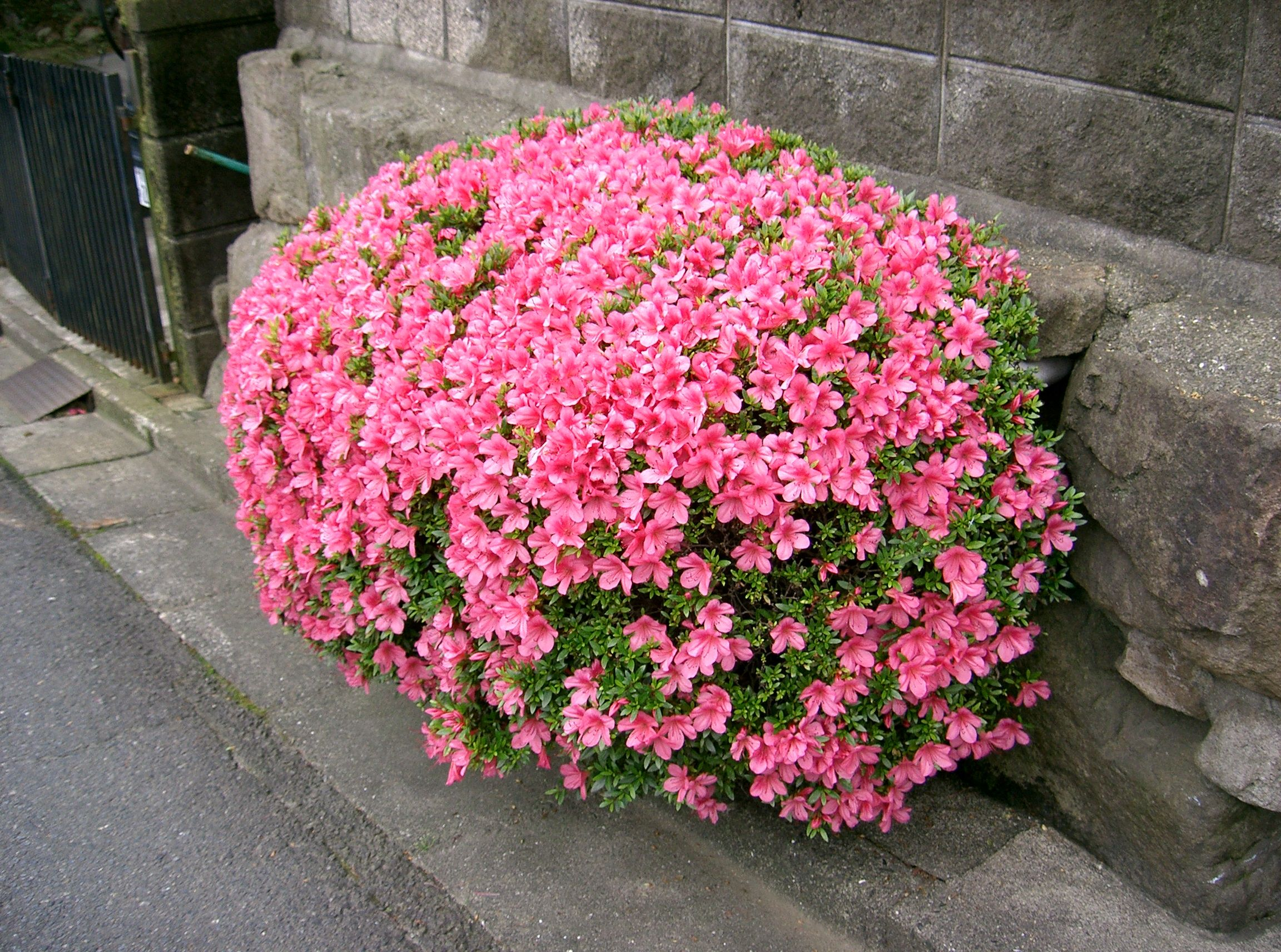
Hedge

== Bibliography ==
- The Linnaean Plant Name Typification Project: Azalea indica L.
- Steve Cafferty and Charles E. Jarvis. Typification of Linnaean Plant Names in Ericaceae. Taxon Vol. 51, No. 4 (Nov., 2002), pp. 751-753
