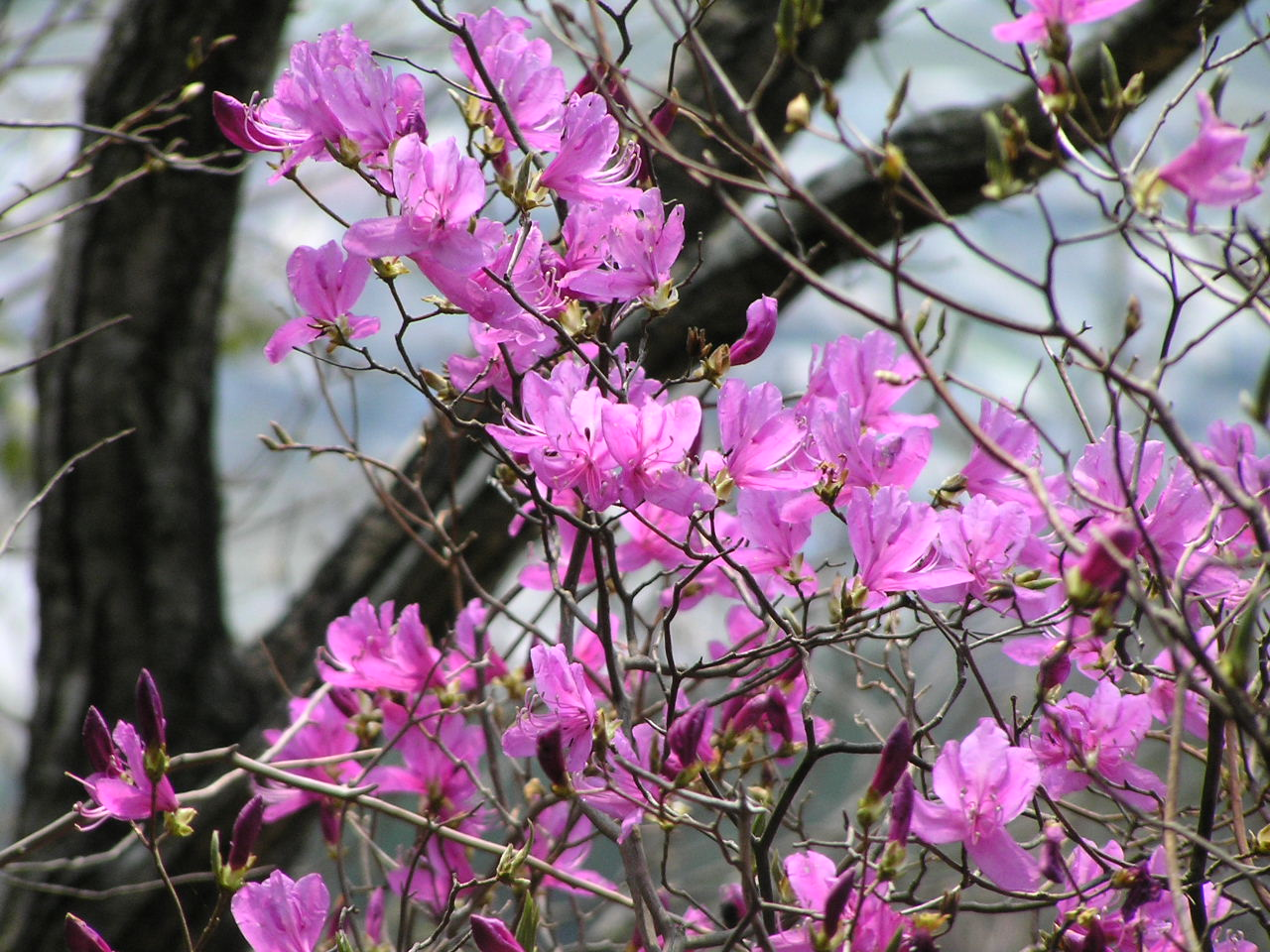

Scientific classification
- Kingdom: Plantae
- Clade: Tracheophytes
- Clade: Angiosperms
- Clade: Eudicots
- Clade: Asterids
- Order: Ericales
- Family: Ericaceae
- Genus: Rhododendron
- Subgenus: Rhododendron subg. Azaleastrum
- Section: Rhododendron sect. Tsutsusi
- Subsection: Rhododendron subsect. Brachycalyx
- Species: R. farrerae

Binomial name
- Rhododendron farrerae Sweet

Synonyms
- Azalea farrerae (Tate) K.Koch

= Rhododendron farrerae =

Species of plant

Rhododendron farrerae, commonly known as Mrs. Farrer's rhododendron, is a deciduous rhododendron species native to China (Hong Kong, Hunan to Fujian), with violet flowers and reaching a height of 60 cm (2 ft.). It is the type species for subsection Brachycalyx. It is found in dense mountain forests at elevations of 800–2100 m.

== Bibliography ==
- The Plant List: Rhododendron farrerae
- Hirsutum.com
