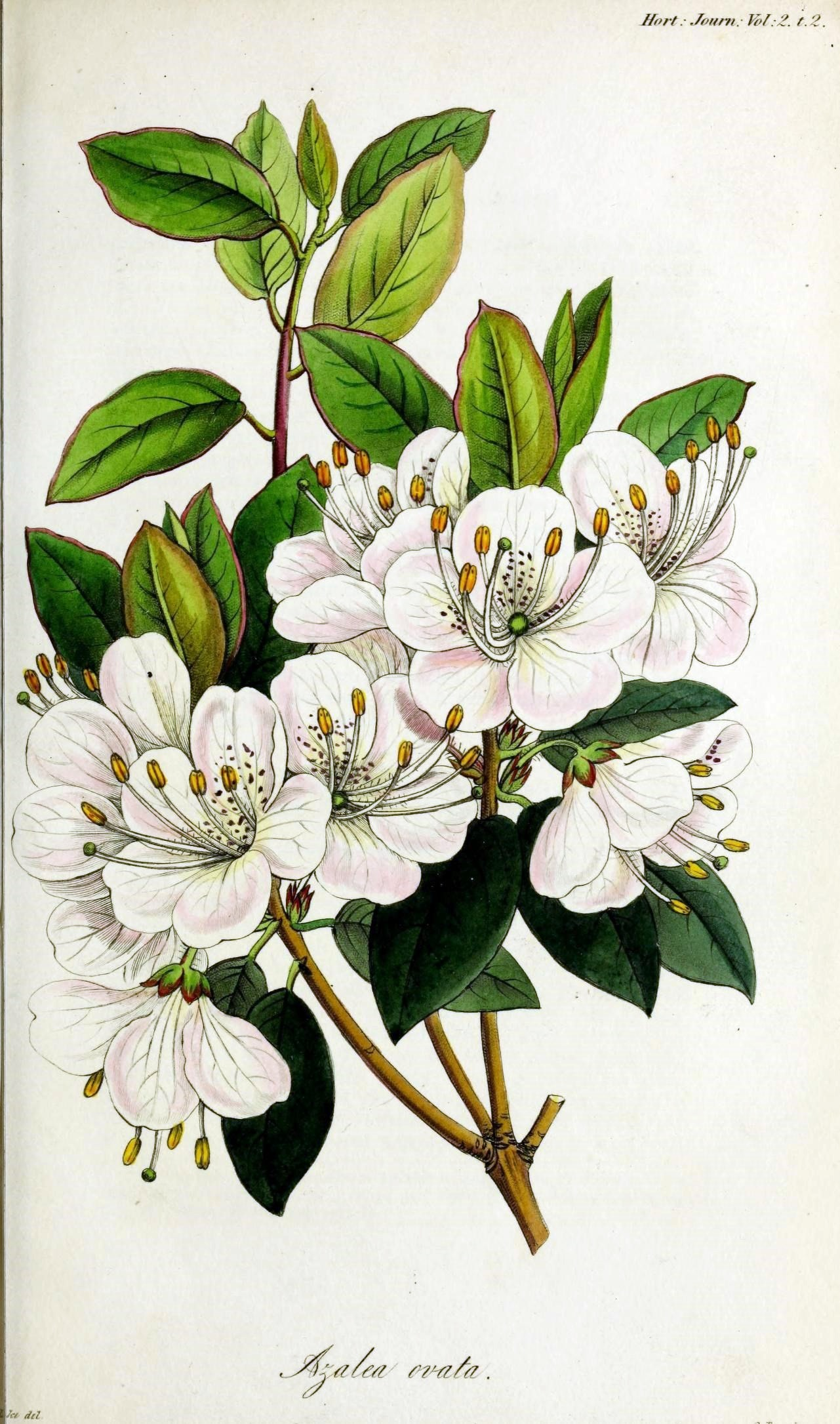

Scientific classification
- Kingdom: Plantae
- Clade: Tracheophytes
- Clade: Angiosperms
- Clade: Eudicots
- Clade: Asterids
- Order: Ericales
- Family: Ericaceae
- Genus: Rhododendron
- Subgenus: Rhododendron subg. Azaleastrum
- Section: Rhododendron sect. Azaleastrum
- Species: R. ovatum

Binomial name
- Rhododendron ovatum (Lindl.) Planch. ex Maxim.

= Rhododendron ovatum =

Species of plant

Rhododendron ovatum is an elepidote rhododendron species native to China and Taiwan. It is the type species for the subgenus, Azaleastrum.

== Bibliography ==
- The Plant List: Rhododendron ovatum
- Hirsutum.com
