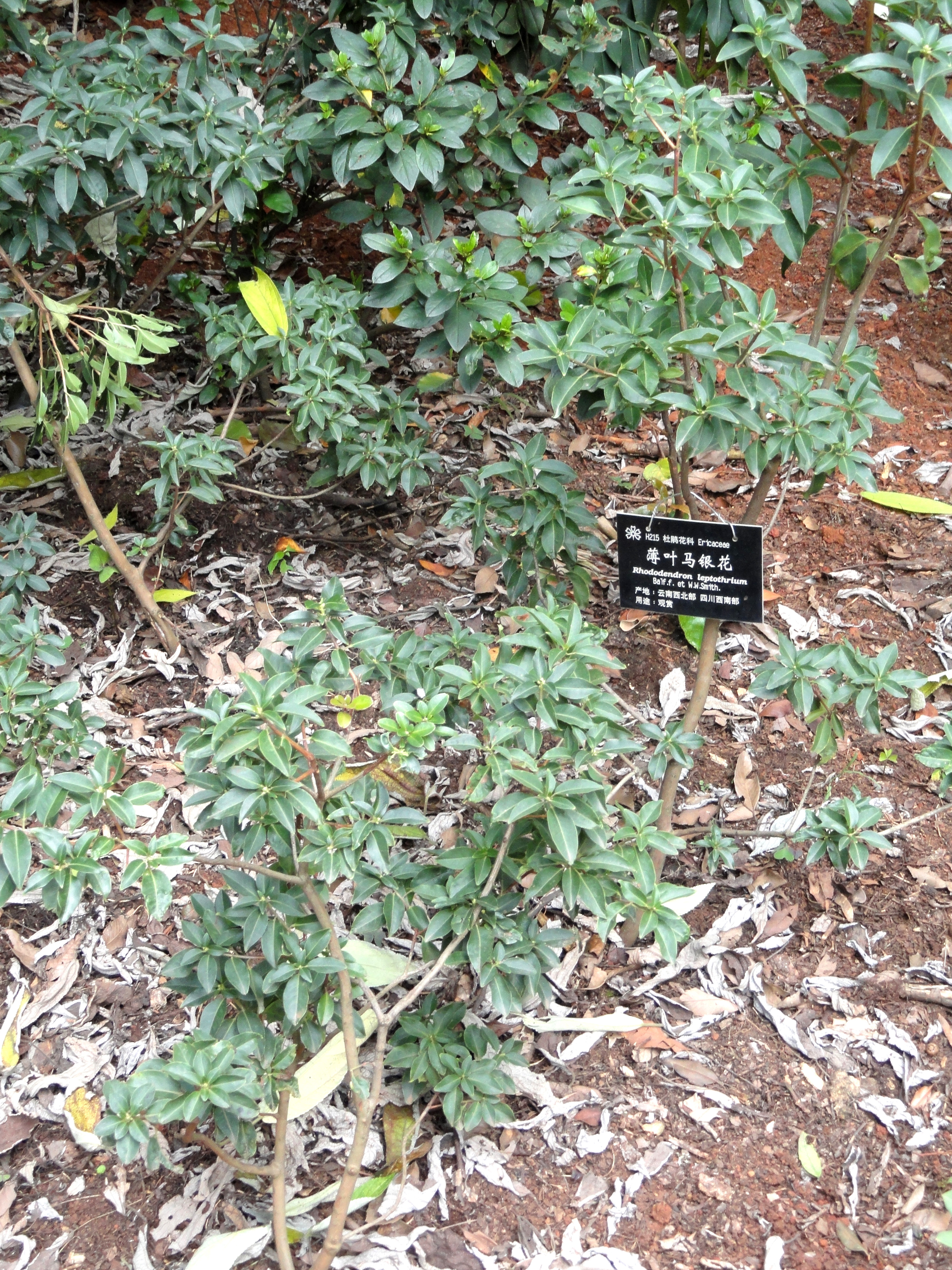

Scientific classification
- Kingdom: Plantae
- Clade: Embryophytes
- Clade: Tracheophytes
- Clade: Spermatophytes
- Clade: Angiosperms
- Clade: Eudicots
- Clade: Asterids
- Order: Ericales
- Family: Ericaceae
- Genus: Rhododendron
- Species: R. leptothrium

Binomial name
- Rhododendron leptothrium Balf.f. & Forrest

Synonyms
- Rhododendron australe Balf.f. & Forrest

= Rhododendron leptothrium =

Species of plant

Rhododendron leptothrium (薄叶马银花) is a species of flowering plant in the family Ericaceae. It is native to Myanmar and southwestern Sichuan, southeastern Xizang, and western Yunnan, China, where it grows at altitudes of 1,700–3,200 m (5,600–10,500 ft).

== Description ==
This evergreen shrub or small tree grows to 3–4 m (9.8–13.1 ft) in height, with leaves that are lanceolate or oblong-lanceolate, 4–12 by 1.8–3.5 cm in size. The flowers are pale rose to magenta-purple.

== Habitat ==
It is native to Myanmar and southwestern Sichuan, southeastern Xizang, and western Yunnan, China, where it grows at altitudes of 1,700–3,200 m (5,600–10,500 ft).

It is a fairly tender species, not tolerating freezing conditions; and therefore of limited interest for cultivation purposes in temperate climates.
