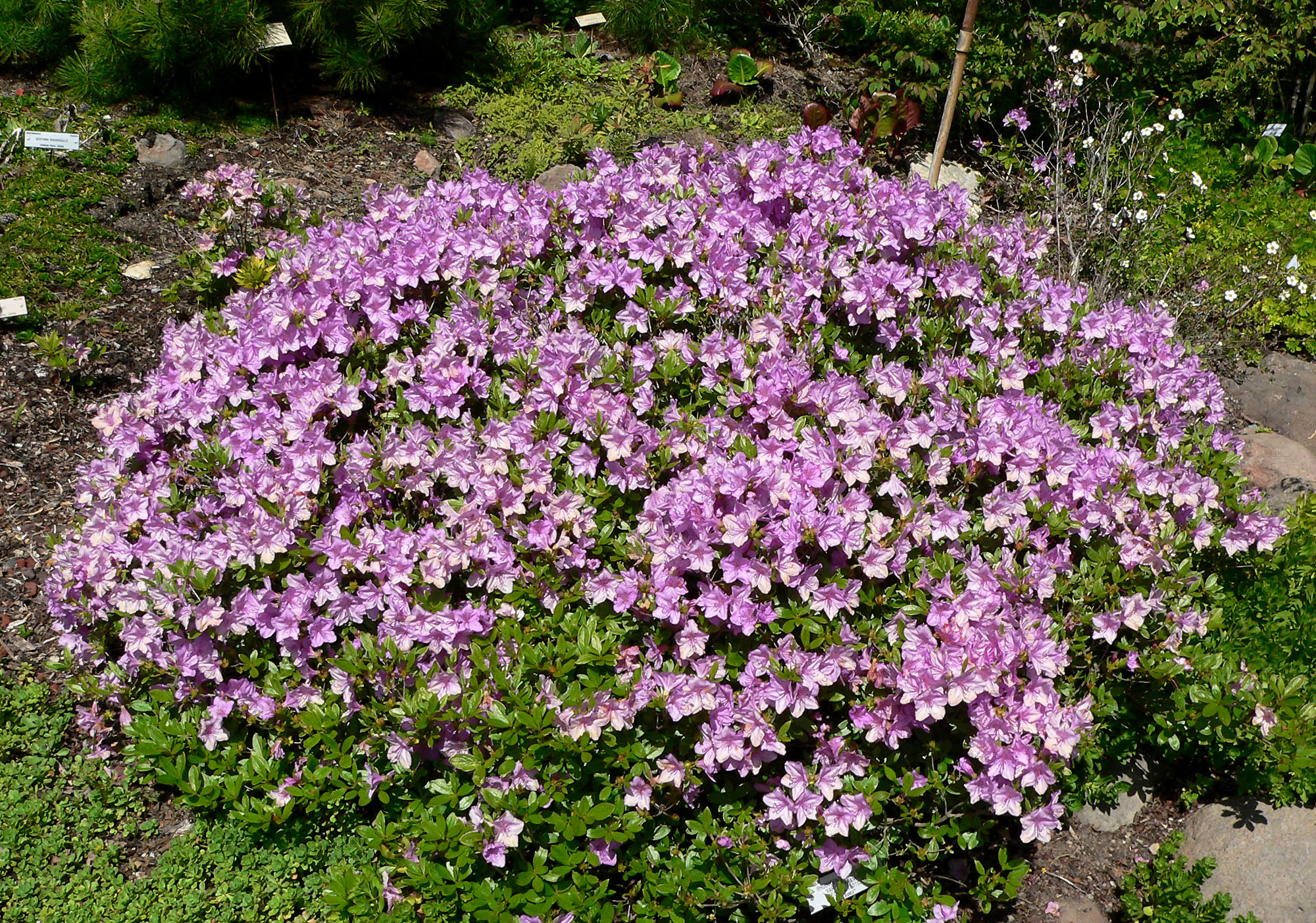
- Rhododendron yedoense f. poukhanense at the University of California Botanical Garden
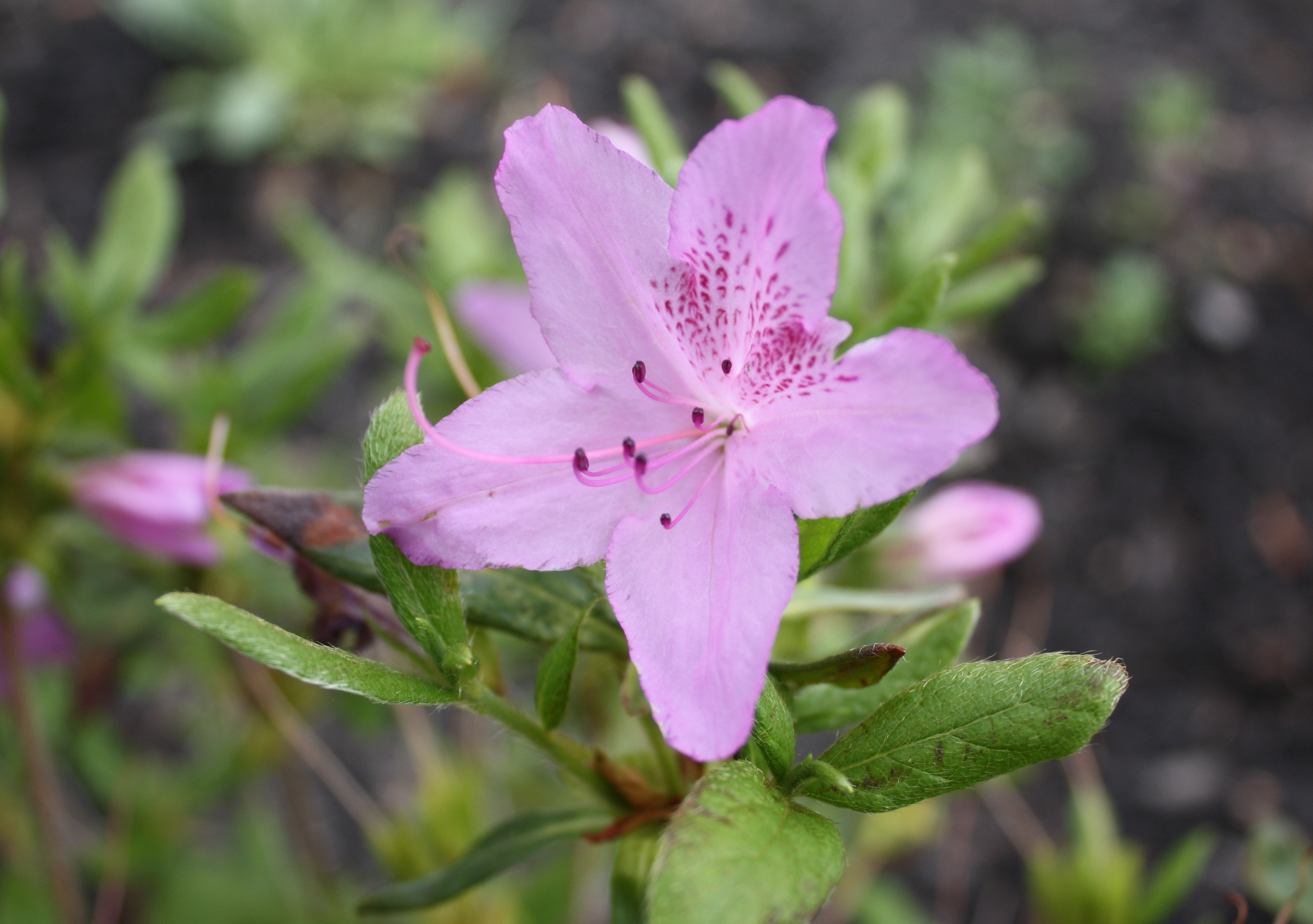
- Close-up of flower

Scientific classification
- Kingdom: Plantae
- Clade: Embryophytes
- Clade: Tracheophytes
- Clade: Spermatophytes
- Clade: Angiosperms
- Clade: Eudicots
- Clade: Asterids
- Order: Ericales
- Family: Ericaceae
- Genus: Rhododendron
- Species: R. yedoense

Binomial name
- Rhododendron yedoense Maxim. ex Regel

Synonyms
- Azalea poukhanensis (H.Lév.) Olmsted, Coville & H.P.Kelsey; Rhododendron coreanum Rehder; Rhododendron hallaisanense H.Lév.; Rhododendron poukhanense H.Lév.; Rhododendron yedoense var. hallaisanense (H.Lév.) T.Yamaz.

= Rhododendron yedoense =

Species of flowering plant

Rhododendron yedoense (syn. Rhododendron poukhanense), the Korean azalea, is a species of flowering plant in the family Ericaceae, with a disjunct distribution in northern Myanmar, Yunnan province in China, South Korea, and northern Kyushu island of Japan. Hardy in USDA zones 4 through 9, it is recommended as a hedge, and has above average resistance to the root rot that often afflicts azaleas. Rhododendron yedoense f. poukhanense is a major parental contributor to many modern hybrid azaleas.

== Subtaxa ==
The following forms are accepted:

- Rhododendron yedoense f. poukhanense (H.Lév.) Sugim. ex T.Yamaz. – South Korea, northern Kyushu
- Rhododendron yedoense f. yedoense – northern Myanmar, Yunnan
