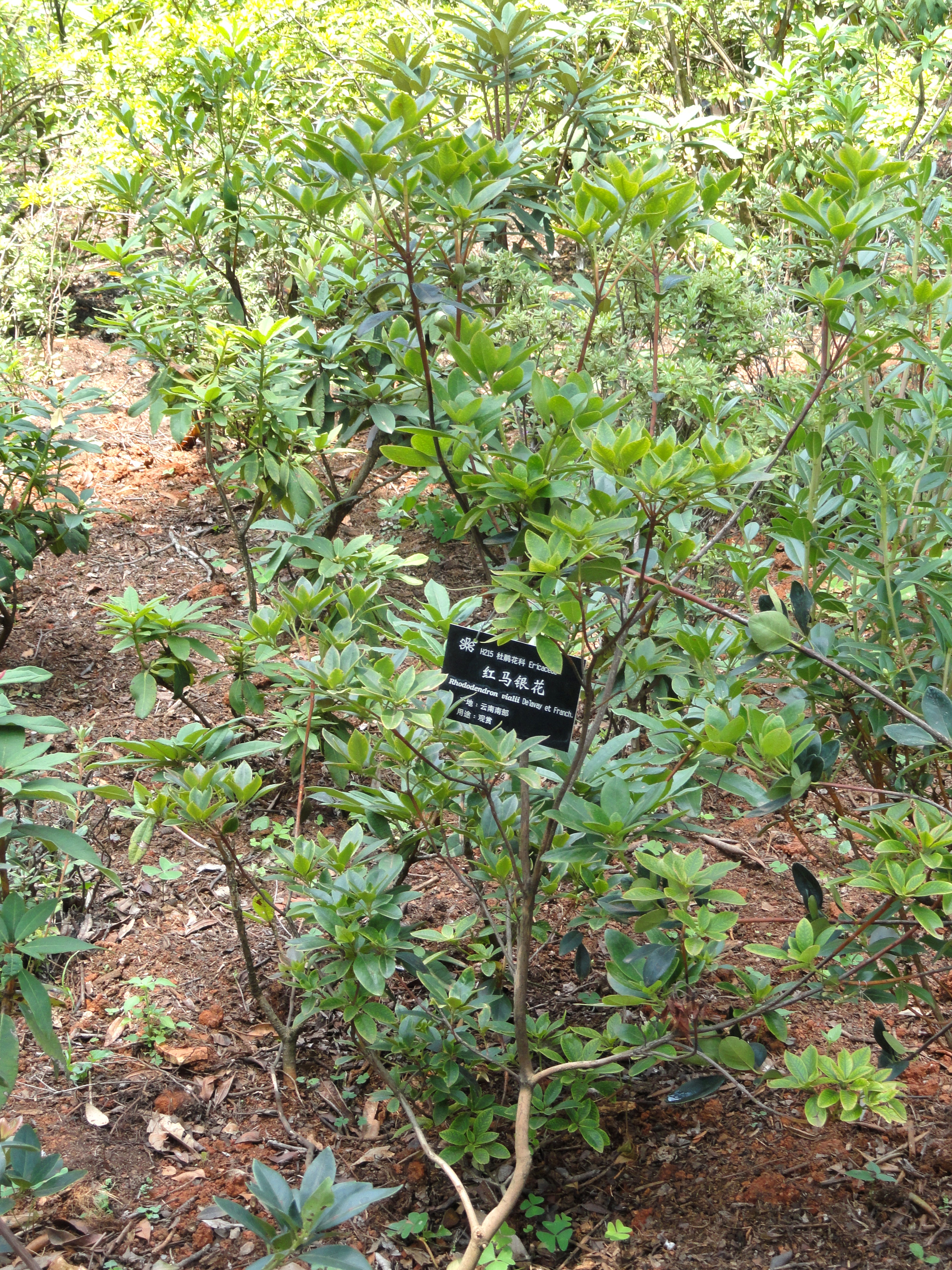

Scientific classification
- Kingdom: Plantae
- Clade: Tracheophytes
- Clade: Angiosperms
- Clade: Eudicots
- Clade: Asterids
- Order: Ericales
- Family: Ericaceae
- Genus: Rhododendron
- Species: R. vialii

Binomial name
- Rhododendron vialii Delavay & Franch.

= Rhododendron vialii =

Species of plant

Rhododendron vialii (红马银花) is a rhododendron species native to Laos, Vietnam, and southern Yunnan, China, where it grows at altitudes of 1,200–1,800 m (3,900–5,900 ft). It is an evergreen shrub growing to 2–4.5 m (6.6–14.8 ft) in height, with leaves that are lanceolate, oblong-lanceolate or obovate-lanceolate, 4–9 by 1.8–4 cm in size. The flowers are dark red.
