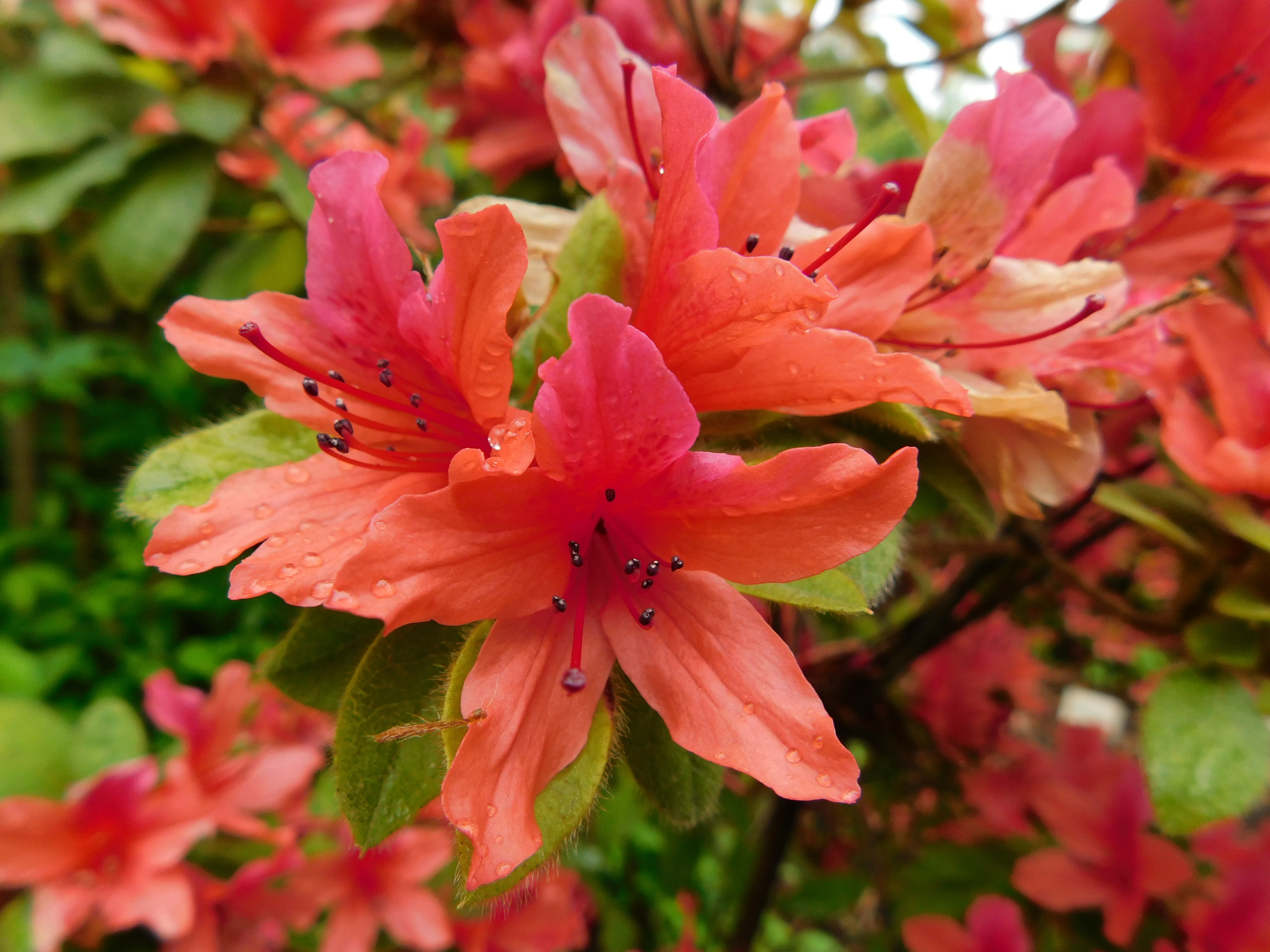

Scientific classification
- Kingdom: Plantae
- Clade: Tracheophytes
- Clade: Angiosperms
- Clade: Eudicots
- Clade: Asterids
- Order: Ericales
- Family: Ericaceae
- Genus: Rhododendron
- Species: R. oldhamii

Binomial name
- Rhododendron oldhamii Maxim.

Synonyms
- Homotypic Synonyms: Azalea oldhamii (Maxim.) Kuntze; Heterotypic Synonyms: Rhododendron oldhamii var. glandulosum Hayata; Rhododendron ovatosepalum Yamam.

= Rhododendron oldhamii =

Taiwan Azalea

Species of plant

Rhododendron oldhamii is a species of azalea in the family Ericaceae. It is commonly known as the taiwan azalea. Other names include: oldham's azalea, tropical azalea, and malaysian rhododendron.

== Distribution ==
Rhododendron oldhamii is endemic to the mountains of Taiwan. It has also been found in Macau, Hong Kong, South Korea, and Sikkim, India.

== Appearance ==
Rhododendron oldhamii can grow up to 3 meters tall. Its flowers can be brick red to pink. It is medium size and grows upright without support. It grows slowly.

== Toxicity ==
Rhododendron oldhamii is harmful to cats, dogs, and humans.

== Reproduction ==
Rhododendron oldhamii can produce flowers, which means it can also produce fruits. It cannot self pollinate.
