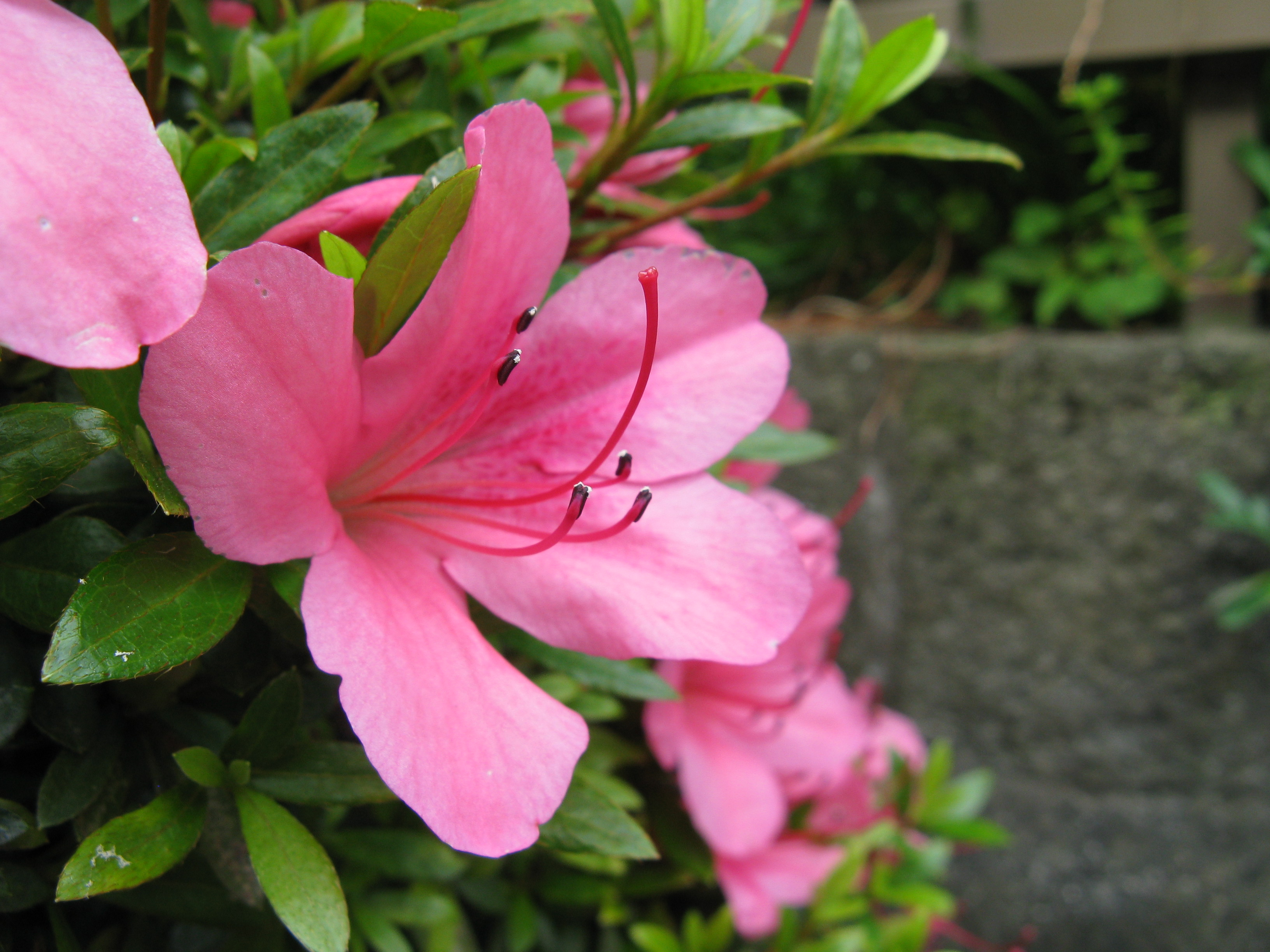
- Rhododendron indicum

Scientific classification
- Kingdom: Plantae
- Clade: Embryophytes
- Clade: Tracheophytes
- Clade: Spermatophytes
- Clade: Angiosperms
- Clade: Eudicots
- Clade: Asterids
- Order: Ericales
- Family: Ericaceae
- Genus: Rhododendron
- Subgenus: Rhododendron subg. Azaleastrum
- Section: Rhododendron sect. Tsutsusi (Sweet) Pojarkova

Type species
- Rhododendron indicum (L.) Sweet

Subsections
- Brachycalyx; Tsutsusi

= Rhododendron sect. Tsutsusi =

Group of shrubs

Rhododendron section Tsutsusi (spelled Tsutsuji in some older texts) is a section of the genus Rhododendron, commonly referred to as the evergreen azaleas. Formerly a subgenus, in 2005 it was reduced to a section and subsumed by subgenus Azaleastrum. Containing 80 to 117 species, it includes both deciduous and evergreen types and is distributed in Japan, China and northeastern Asia. They are of high cultural importance to the Japanese. Among the species in this genus lie the largest flowering azaleas.

== Description ==
Tsutsusi are characterised by the presence of terminal buds that contain both floral and vegetative shoots. Many also have flattened multicellular ferrugineous (rust coloured) hairs, which can cover the leaves and stems providing a coppery appearance, or pseudoverticillate leaves that are rhombic in shape. However some have hairs confined to the axils, or base of floral buds.

== Taxonomy ==
The section has traditionally included two subsections, classified on the basis of their leaves, young twigs and corolla. Phylogenetic analysis has confirmed both the monophyly of the section and its subsections.

=== Subsections ===
- Rhododendron subsect. Brachycalyx Sweet, type Rhododendron farrerae. 15 species. - leaves deciduous, pseudoverticillate, rhombic, crowded at the shoot apex and monomorphic, hairs usually confined to axils, found mainly outside China.
- Rhododendron subsect. Tsutsusi Sweet, type Rhododendron indicum. 66 species. - leaves dimorphic, generally deciduous but some apical leaves over winter, young twigs with flattened multicellular hairs that are more widely distributed.

The results of molecular analyses reveal that morphological features such as flower colour, corolla size, or whether leaves are mono- or dimorphic, appear to not be very useful in sorting out the phylogenetic relationships within section Tsutsusi.

=== Etymology ===
Tsutsusi comes from the Japanese word for Azalea, Tsutsuji ( つつじ or ツツジ). When Don (1834) described the subdivisions of Rhododendron he named one of his eight sections, Tsutsutsi (sic), which he explained was the Chinese name of the first species described (R. indicum, originally Azalea indica L.). The term was first used by Engelbert Kaempfer (who unlike Linnaeus preferred native names), in Japan and then incorporated into Michel Adanson's taxonomy (1763) as Tsutsusi Kaempf., a genus separate from Rhododendron, in the family Vaccinia or Aireles (Family 22/58, later Ericaceae). Adanson gives genus Tsutsusi as synonymous with the earlier Azalea L. Subsequent authors such as Don (1834) and Candolle (1838) continued the use of the vernacular word Tsutsusi to describe a subdivision of the genus.

== Distribution ==
Temperate and subtropical regions of China and Japan, but also found occasionally in Korea, Thailand, Myanmar, Laos and India.

== Cultivation ==
The Tsutsusi are amongst the most popular of the cultivated azaleas, and were cultivated in China and Japan prior to their introduction to Europe, and have an important role in the horticultural industry. They are grown as landscape plants in appropriate climates, and also as potted plants and Bonsai.

== Bibliography ==
- Wilson EH, Rehder A. A MONOGRAPH OF AZALEAS RHODODENDRON SUBGENUS ANTHODENDRON. THE UNIVERSITY PRESS, CAMBRIDGE April 15 1921. PUBLICATIONS OF THE ARNOLD ARBORETUM, No. 9
- Chamberlain, DF (1990). "A revision of Rhododendron. IV Subgenus Tsutsusi". Edinburgh Journal of Botany. 47 (2): 89–200. doi:10.1017/S096042860000319X.
- Craven, L.A.; Goetsch, L.A.; Hall, B.D.; Brown, G.K. (2008). "Classification of the Vireya group of Rhododendron (Ericaceae)". Blumea - Biodiversity, Evolution and Biogeography of Plants. 53 (2): 435–442. doi:10.3767/000651908X608070.
- Yue-Jiao, ZHANG; Xiao-Feng, JIN; Bing-Yang, DING; Jing-Ping, ZHU (2009). "Pollen morphology of Rhododendron subgen. Tsutsusi and its systematic implications". Journal of Systematics and Evolution. 47 (2): 123–138. doi:10.1111/j.1759-6831.2009.00011.x. S2CID 86594487.
- Xiao-Feng, Jin; Bing-Yang, Ding; Yue-Jiao, Zhang; De-Yuan, Hong (2010). "A Taxonomic Revision Of Rhododendron subg. Tsutsusi sect. Brachycalyx (Ericaceae)". Annals of the Missouri Botanical Garden. 97 (2): 163–190. doi:10.3417/2007139. S2CID 86507576.
