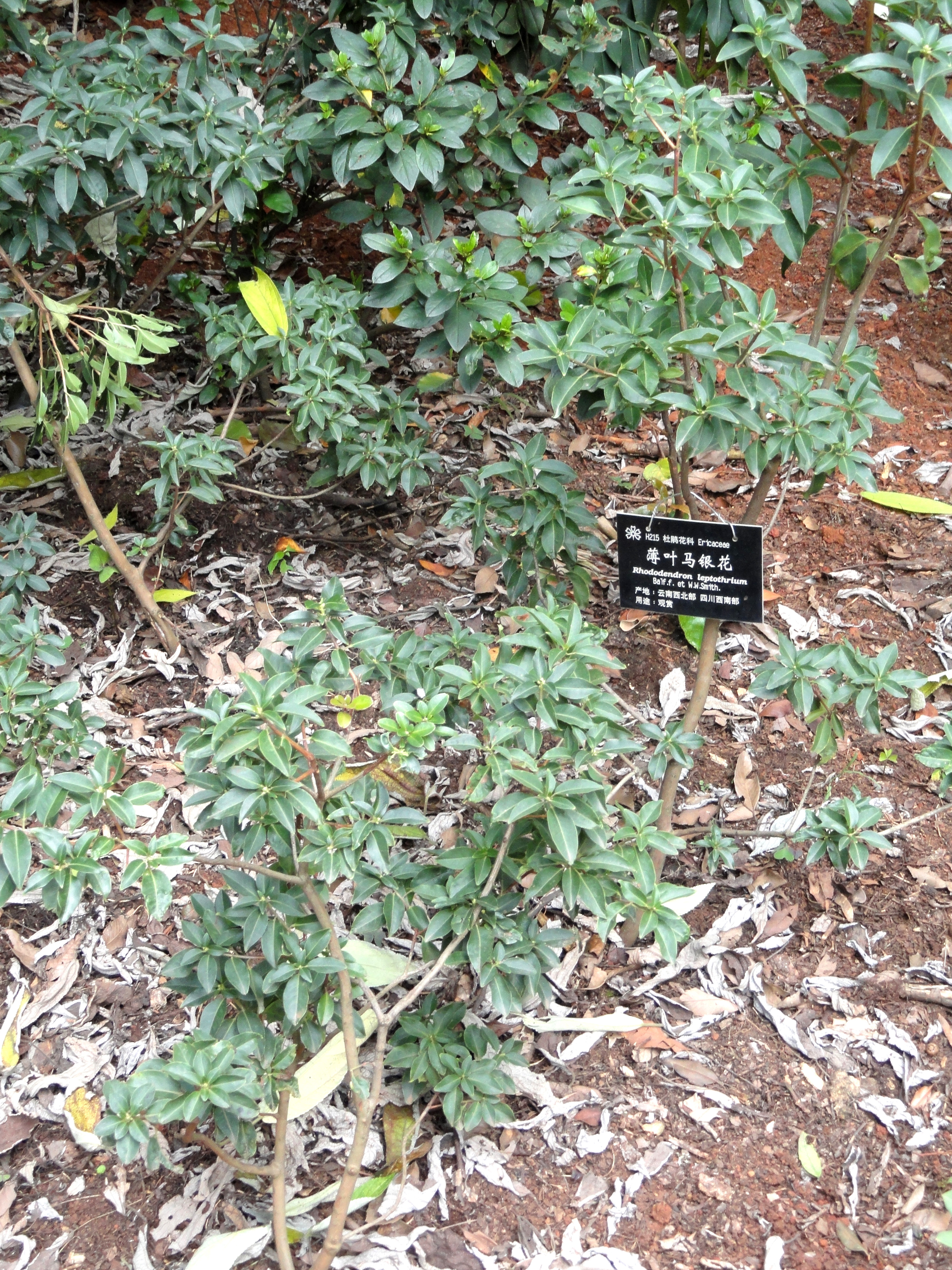
- Rhododendron leptothrium

Scientific classification
- Kingdom: Plantae
- Clade: Embryophytes
- Clade: Tracheophytes
- Clade: Spermatophytes
- Clade: Angiosperms
- Clade: Eudicots
- Clade: Asterids
- Order: Ericales
- Family: Ericaceae
- Genus: Rhododendron
- Subgenus: Rhododendron subg. Azaleastrum; Planch., 1854

Type species
- Rhododendron ovatum

Sections
- Azaleastrum; Sciadorhodion; Tsutsusi

= Rhododendron subg. Azaleastrum =

Subgenus of flowering plants

Rhododendron subgenus Azaleastrum is a subgenus of the genus Rhododendron.

The subgenus included two sections, however in 2005, Choniastrum was elevated to subgenus rank, but sections Sciadorhodion and Tsutsusi were added, providing a new total of three sections.

- Azaleastrum sect. Azaleastrum (10 species)
- Azaleastrum sect. Sciadorhodion (16 species)
- Azaleastrum sect. Tsutsusi (81 species)

== Bibliography ==
- Wilson EH, Rehder A. A MONOGRAPH OF AZALEAS RHODODENDRON SUBGENUS ANTHODENDRON. THE UNIVERSITY PRESS, CAMBRIDGE April 15 1921. PUBLICATIONS OF THE ARNOLD ARBORETUM, No. 9
- Craven, L.A.; Goetsch, L.A.; Hall, B.D.; Brown, G.K. (2008). "Classification of the Vireya group of Rhododendron (Ericaceae)". Blumea - Biodiversity, Evolution and Biogeography of Plants. 53 (2): 435. doi:10.3767/000651908X608070.
