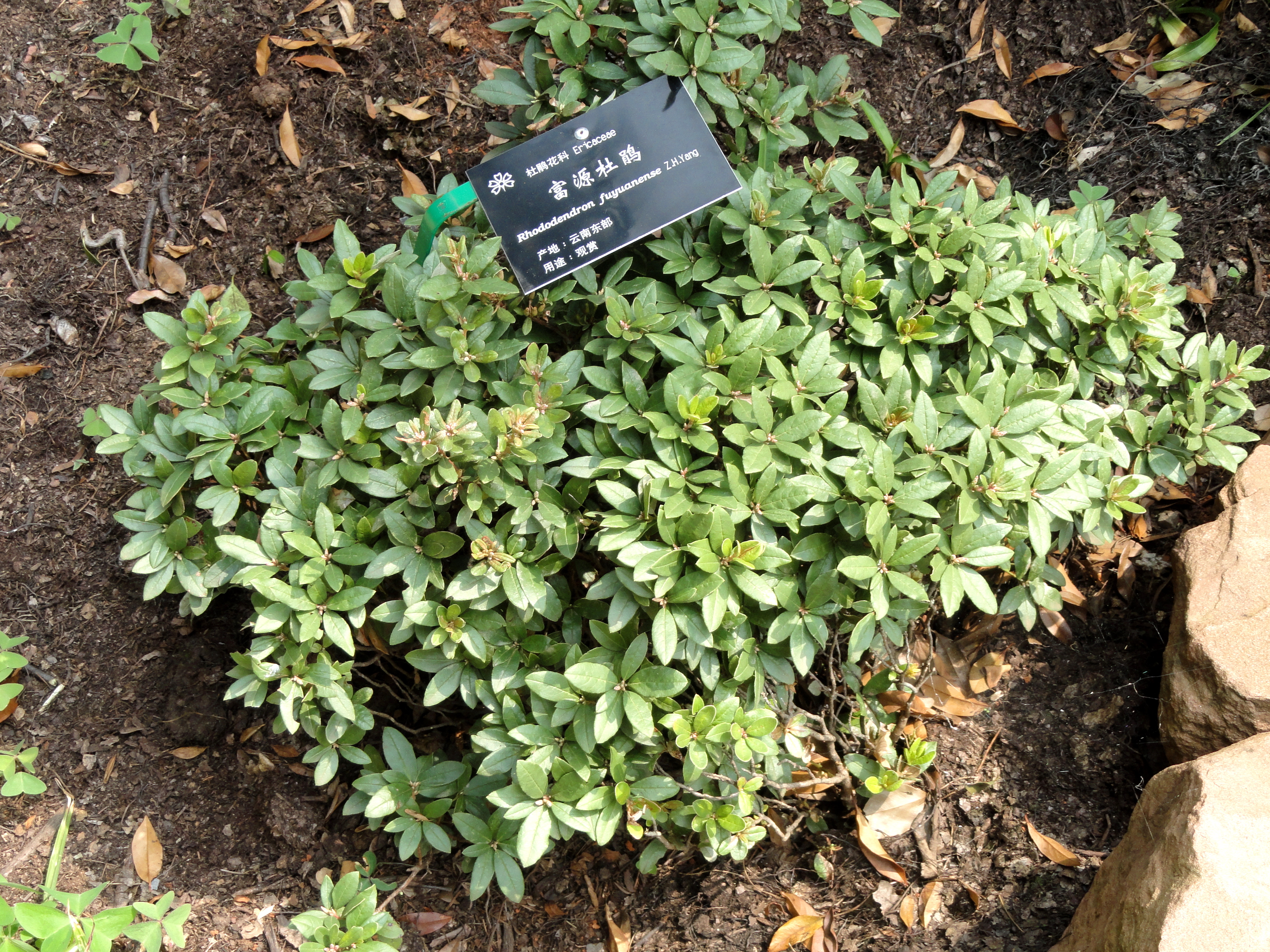

Scientific classification
- Kingdom: Plantae
- Clade: Tracheophytes
- Clade: Angiosperms
- Clade: Eudicots
- Clade: Asterids
- Order: Ericales
- Family: Ericaceae
- Genus: Rhododendron
- Species: R. fuyuanense

Binomial name
- Rhododendron fuyuanense Z.H. Yang

= Rhododendron fuyuanense =

Species of plant

Rhododendron fuyuanense (富源杜鹃) is a rhododendron species native to eastern Yunnan, China, where it grows at altitudes of about 2,000 m (6,600 ft). It is a shrub that grows to 50–250 cm (20–98 in) in height, with leaves that are elliptic or narrowly elliptic, 1.2–3.5 by 0.6–1.2 cm in size. Flowers are purplish red.
