= Breite Oak Tree Reserve =

Nature reserve in Sighișoara, Romania

Breite Nature Reserve
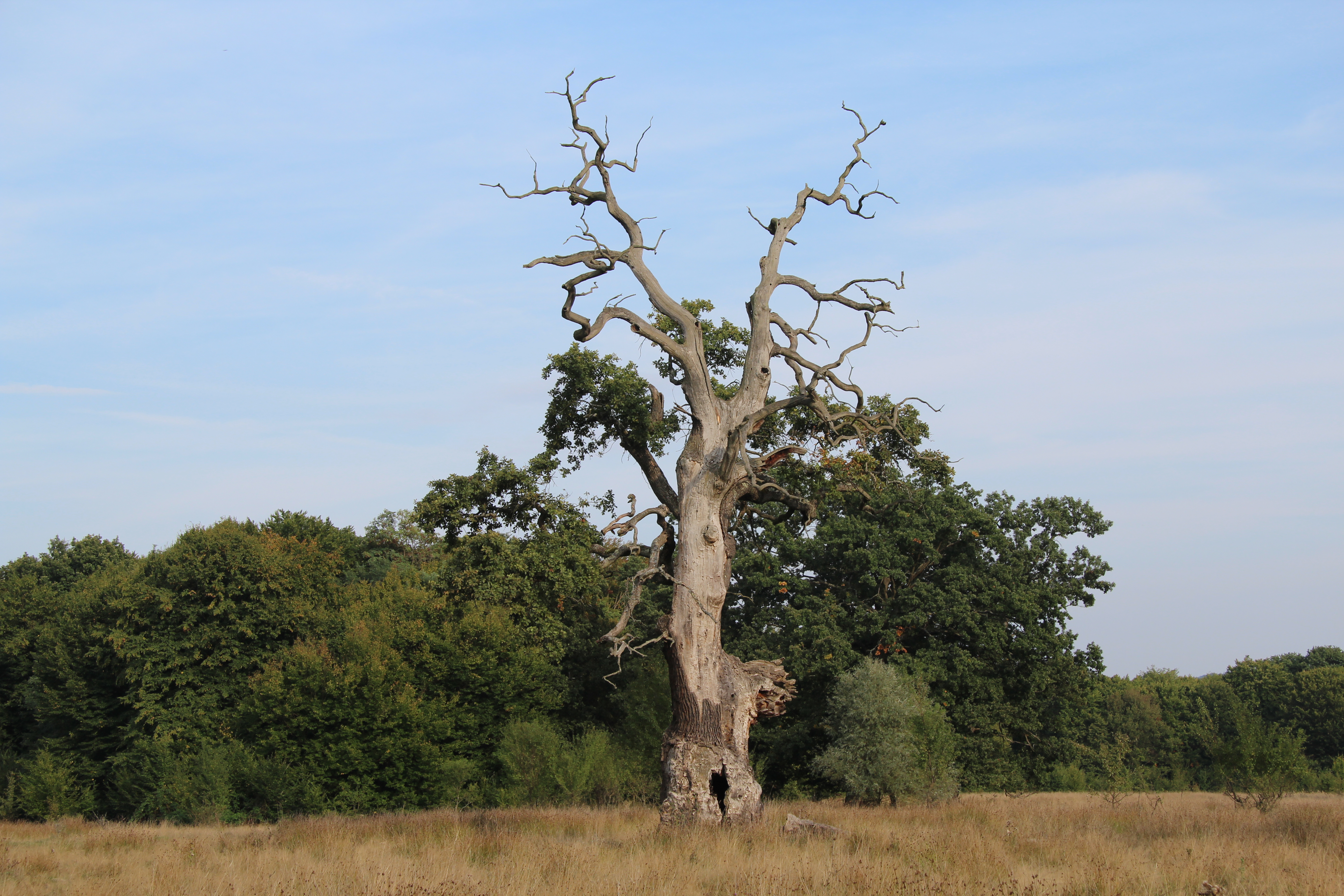
- Breite Ancient Oak Tree Reserve, Sighisoara, Romania

- Location within Romania
- Location: Sighișoara, Romania
- Coordinates: 46.1934°N 24.7559°E
- Area: 74 ha (180 acres)

The Breite Oak Tree Reserve (Stejarii Seculari De La Breite in Romanian, derived from Breite (/ˈbʁaɪ̯tə/), literally breadth or width in German) is a 74-hectare (180-acre) nature reserve sitting on a plateau atop Sighișoara, Romania. The largest grassland plateau in Europe, the Breite Reserve has attracted visitors for hundreds of years. It is commonly regarded as one of the largest, most representative and well-preserved wood-pastures with hornbeam and oak trees in Central and Eastern Europe.

== History ==
The Breite (also appearing as the Kahle or Kalte Breite in historical documents) is a culturally modified forest that carries the local Transylvanian Saxon culture over eight centuries. Both in terms of natural heritage and as a lineage of Sighișoara, the Breite is unique in value in Europe. It has been used by the local communities for centuries, as pastureland and for pannage, but also as a source of wood and as a place for recreation. The oaks from Breite are the oldest living things in Sighișoara; some of them are said to have been present at the foundation stone of the fortress settlement and survived the tumultuous events in the history of Transylvania, from wars and changes of sovereignty, to fires and earthquake.

During the communist era attempts were made to turn the plateau into an airport and arable land, still visible in the drainage ditches that run through the area. There were also plans to create a Dracula-themed park there (Vlad Dracula was born in Sighișoara), but these were abandoned due to local protests.

After 1998 the area was increasingly abandoned, which led to it being overgrown quickly, especially by willow and hornbeam. This only stopped after its admission in the Natura 2000 network, which resulted in the suppression of uncontrolled regeneration, the resumption of controlled grazing and other types of management.

== Ecology ==
There are more than 500 trees aged between 200 and 800 years on the Breite, mostly pedunculate oaks, sessile oaks, their hybrids and dalechamp's oaks. Each is a microcosm which provides food and shelter for dozens of other species of animals and plants. Other trees include hornbeam, which occurs in the form of isolated individuals and extensive carpets of dwarf bushes, as well as wild pears, crab apple trees, hawthorns, blackthorn and other wild plums. In the surrounding forests and in the abandoned southern part, beech dominates. 8 species of amphibians, 4 reptilians, 27 species of nesting birds and 38 species of mammals, including bears and wolves, 77 species of vertebrates in total, as well as 476 species of plants and 40 species of xylophagous beetles alone have been identified on the plateau.

== Topography ==
The altitude is between 504 and 530 m (1,654 and 1,739 ft) above sea level, rising gradually from north to south. The plateau has an elongated shape, the distance between the two ends being 4 km (2.5 mi) the northern end of the plateau is close to the city of Sighișoara. Access is possible down the hill district Corneşti Visia (Himmelswiese), or "Pit" Ipătescu Ana neighborhood. Access by car is on Route 14, which connects the town of Sighișoara to Mediaș from point "Hula Danes". On the left, the Sighioara 4 km (2.5 mi), 2 km (1.2 mi) starts a forest road that climbs the plateau.
