= Ceilings of the Natural History Museum, London =

Decorated ceilings

Coordinates: 51°29′46″N 00°10′35″W

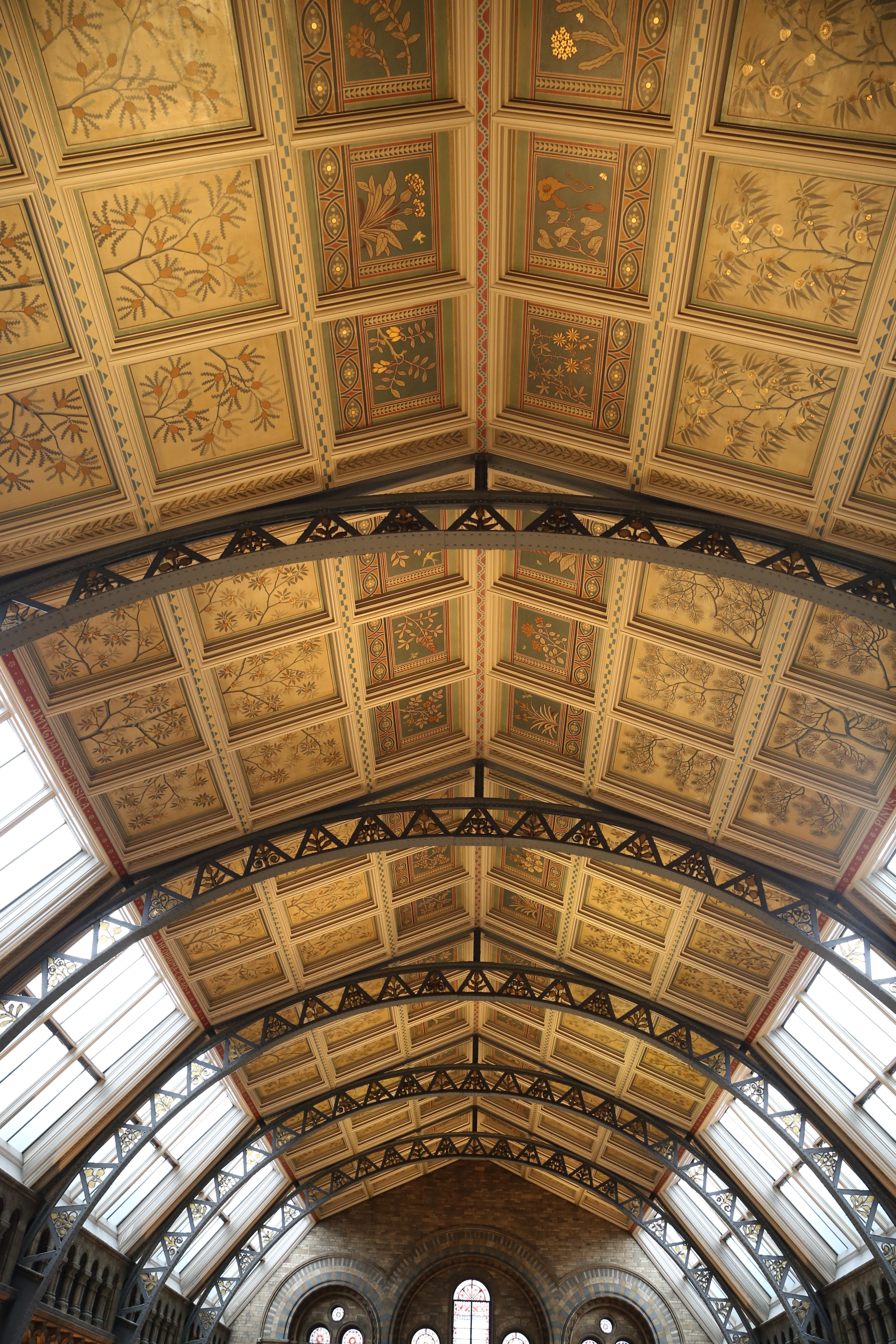
Central Hall (now Hintze Hall) ceiling in 2013

A pair of decorated ceilings in the main Central Hall (officially Hintze Hall since 2014) and smaller North Hall of the Natural History Museum in South Kensington, London, were unveiled at the building's opening in 1881. They were designed by the museum's architect Alfred Waterhouse and painted by the artist Charles James Lea. The ceiling of the Central Hall consists of 162 panels, 108 of which depict plants considered significant to the history of the museum, to the British Empire or the museum's visitors and the remainder are highly stylised decorative botanical paintings. The ceiling of the smaller North Hall consists of 36 panels, 18 of which depict plants growing in the British Isles. Painted directly onto the plaster of the ceilings, they also make use of gilding for visual effect.

The natural history collections had originally shared a building with their parent institution the British Museum, but with the expansion of the British Empire there was a significant increase in both public and commercial interest in natural history, and in the number of specimens added to the museum's natural history collections. In 1860 it was agreed that a separate museum of natural history would be created in a large building, capable of displaying the largest specimens, such as whales. The superintendent of the natural history departments, Richard Owen, envisaged that visitors would enter a large central hall containing what he termed an "index collection" of representative exhibits, from which other galleries would radiate, and a smaller hall to the north would display the natural history of the British Isles. Waterhouse's Romanesque design for the museum included decorative painted ceilings. Acton Smee Ayrton, the First Commissioner of Works, refused to permit the decoration of the ceilings on grounds of cost, but Waterhouse convinced him that provided the painting took place while the scaffolding from the museum's construction was still in place it would incur no extra cost; he further managed to convince Ayrton that the ceiling would be more appealing if elements of the paintings were gilded.

The ceiling of the Central Hall consists of six rows of painted panels, three on each side of the roof's apex. Above the landing at the southern end of the building, the ceiling is divided into nine-panel blocks. The uppermost three panels in each block consist of what Waterhouse termed "archaic" panels, depicting stylised plants on a green background. Each of the lower six panels in each block depicts a plant considered of particular significance to the British Empire, against a pale background. Above the remainder of the Central Hall the archaic panels remain in the same style, but each set of six lower panels depicts a single plant, spreading across the six panels and against the same pale background; these represent plants considered of particular significance either to visitors, or to the history of the museum. The ceiling of the smaller North Hall comprises just four rows of panels. The two uppermost rows are of a simple design of heraldic symbols of the then constituent countries of the United Kingdom; each panel in the lower two rows depicts a different plant found in Britain or Ireland, in keeping with the room's intended purpose as a display of British natural history.

As the ceilings were built cheaply, they are extremely fragile and require regular repair. They underwent significant conservation work in 1924, 1975 and 2016. The restoration in 2016 coincided with the removal of "Dippy", a cast of a Diplodocus skeleton which had previously stood in the Central Hall, and the installation of Hope, a skeleton of a blue whale suspended from the ceiling.

== Background ==
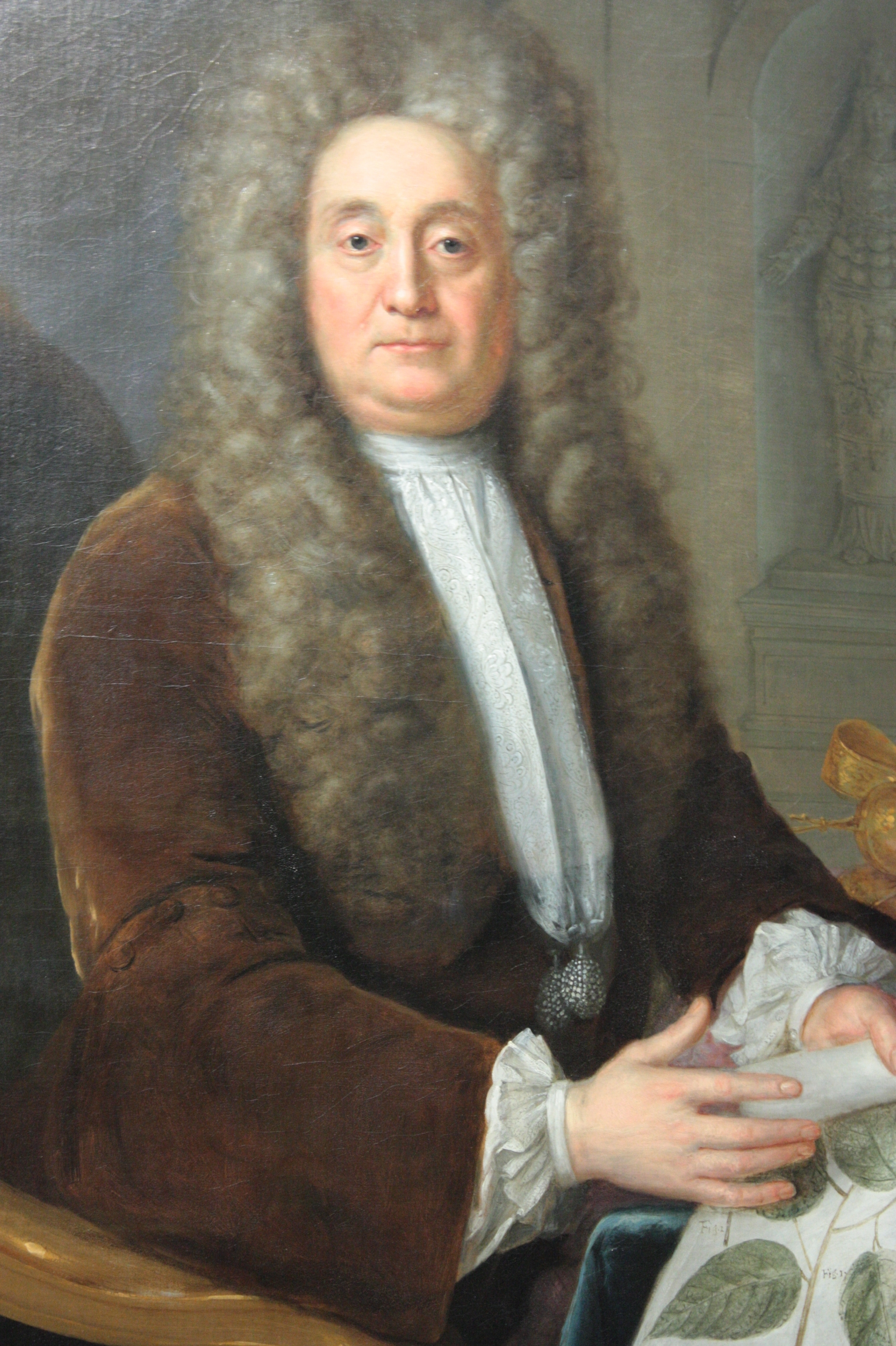
Hans Sloane

Irish physician Hans Sloane was born in 1660, and since childhood had a fascination with natural history. In 1687 Sloane was appointed personal doctor to Christopher Monck, the newly appointed Lieutenant Governor of Jamaica, and lived on that island until Monck died in October 1688. During his free time in Jamaica Sloane indulged his passion for biology and botany, and on his return to London brought with him a collection of plants, animal and mineral specimens and numerous drawings and notes regarding the local wildlife, which eventually became the basis for his major work A Voyage to the Islands Madera, Barbados, Nieves, S. Christophers and Jamaica (1707–1725). He became one of England's leading doctors, credited with the invention of chocolate milk and with the popularisation of quinine as a medicine, (Note: Sloane's chocolate milk was intended for medicinal use, in particular as a believed cure for tuberculosis and fainting fits.) and in 1727 King George II appointed him Physician in Ordinary (doctor to the Royal Household).

Building on the collection he had brought from Jamaica, Sloane continued to collect throughout his life, using his new-found wealth to buy items from other collectors and to buy out the collections of existing museums. (Note: Sloane's motivation for collecting is unknown. Towards his death he claimed that by studying as much of the world as possible he hoped to have a closer understanding of the will of God, but there is little evidence that he was particularly pious during most of the period in which he assembled his collections.) During Sloane's life there were few public museums in England, and by 1710 Sloane's collection filled 11 large rooms, which he allowed the public to visit. Following his death on 11 January 1753, Sloane stipulated that his collection—by this time filling two large houses—was to be kept together for the public benefit if at all possible. The collection was initially offered to King George II, who was reluctant to meet the £20,000 (about £3,800,000 in 2025 terms) purchase cost stipulated in Sloane's will. (Note: Hans Sloane's will was specific as to how the collection was to be disposed of. He named a committee of 63 trustees, a mixture of scientists, politicians, religious figures, other collectors, business leaders and Sloane family members. The trustees were instructed to offer the collection for £20,000 to the King; if the King declined to purchase it they were to offer it to the Royal Society, Oxford University and the Royal College of Physicians of Edinburgh, and if they declined it was to be offered to an assortment of foreign academic bodies. Only if none of the named institutions were willing to purchase the collection were the trustees to allow it to be broken up.) Parliament ultimately agreed to establish a national lottery to fund the purchase of Sloane's collection and the Harleian Library which was also currently for sale, and to unite them with the Cotton library, which had been bequeathed to the nation in 1702, to create a national collection. On 7 June 1753 the British Museum Act 1753 was passed, authorising the unification of the three collections as the British Museum and establishing the national lottery to fund the purchase of the collections and to provide funds for their maintenance.

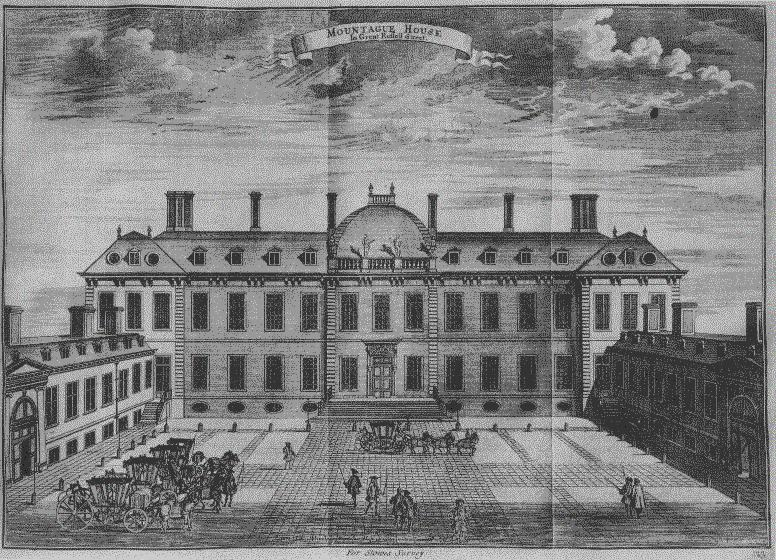
Montagu House at the time of its transfer to the newly created British Museum

The trustees settled on Montagu House in Bloomsbury as a home for the new British Museum, opening it to the public for the first time on 15 January 1759. (Note: Although the collections were open to the public, the early British Museum was not easy to visit. Prospective visitors had to apply in writing to the porter and return the next day to find out whether they had been judged 'fit and proper persons', only after which would they be issued a ticket to attend at a specified time in future. Visitors were not permitted to spend more than an hour in each of the three departments of Natural and Artificial Productions, Printed Books, and Manuscripts.) With the British Museum now established numerous other collectors began to donate and bequeath items to the museum's collections, which were further swelled by large quantities of exhibits brought to England in 1771 by the first voyage of James Cook, by a large collection of Egyptian antiquities (including the Rosetta Stone) ceded by the French in the Capitulation of Alexandria, by the 1816 purchase of the Elgin Marbles by the British government who in turn passed them to the museum, and by the 1820 bequest of the vast botanical collections of Joseph Banks. (Note: Joseph Banks had accompanied Captain James Cook on his voyage to Australia. Banks persuaded Cook to call his landing site Botany Bay, on account of the wide variety of specimens he collected there; Cook had intended to call the site Stingray Bay. Banks went on to become one of the founders of Kew Gardens.) Other collectors continued to sell, donate or bequeath their collections to the museum, and by 1807 it was clear that Montagu House was unable to accommodate the museum's holdings. In 1808–09, in an effort to save space, the newly appointed keeper of the natural history department George Shaw felt obliged to destroy large numbers of the museum's specimens in a series of bonfires in the museum's gardens. The 1821 bequest of the library of 60,000 books assembled by George III forced the trustees to address the issue, as the bequest was on condition that the collection be displayed in a single room, and Montagu House had no such room available. In 1823 Robert Smirke was hired to design a replacement building, the first parts of which opened in 1827 and which was completed in the 1840s.

=== Plans for a Natural History building ===
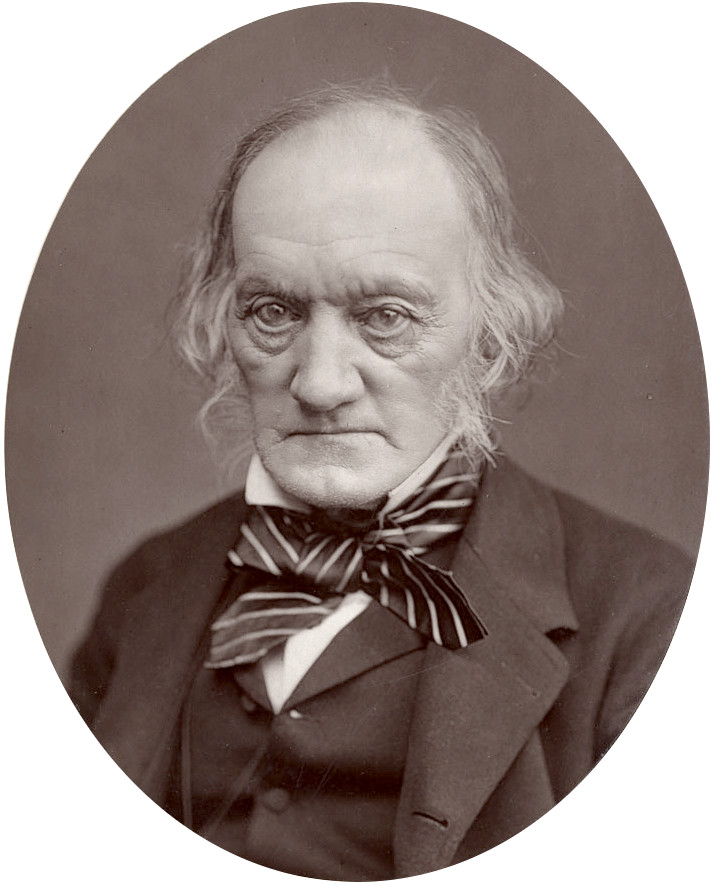
Richard Owen, 1878

With more space for displays and able to accommodate large numbers of visitors, the new British Museum proved a success with the public, and the natural history department proved particularly popular. Although the museum's management had traditionally been dominated by classicists and antiquarians, in 1856 the natural history department was split into separate departments of botany, zoology, mineralogy and geology, each with their own keeper and with botanist and palaeontologist Richard Owen as superintendent of the four departments. By this time the expansion of the British Empire had led to an increased appreciation of the importance of natural history on the part of the authorities, as territorial expansion had given British companies access to unfamiliar species, the commercial possibilities of which needed to be investigated. (Note: A similar approach to natural history had already been undertaken by Spain during its colonial expansion in the Americas; from 1712 onwards Spanish government and religious officials were obliged to record and report on any plants, animals or minerals they encountered with potential commercial uses.)

By the time of Owen's appointment, the collections of the natural history departments had increased tenfold in size in the preceding 20 years, and the museum was again suffering from a chronic lack of space. There had also long been criticism that because of the varied nature of its displays the museum was confusing and lacked coherence; as early as 1824 Sir Robert Peel, the Home Secretary, had commented that "what with marbles, statues, butterflies, manuscripts, books and pictures, I think the museum is a farrago that distracts attention". Owen proposed that the museum be split into separate buildings, with one building to house the works of Man (art, antiquities, books and manuscripts) and one to house the works of God (the natural history departments); he argued that the expansion of the British Empire had led to an increased ability to procure specimens, and that increased space to store and display these specimens would both aid scholarship, and enhance Britain's prestige.

The great instrument of zoological science, as Lord Bacon points out, is a Museum of Natural History. Every civilized state in Europe possesses such a Museum. That of England has been progressively developed to the extent which the restrictive circumstances under which it originated have allowed. The public is now fully aware, by the reports that have been published by Parliament, by representations to Government, and by articles in Reviews and other Periodicals, of the present condition of the National Museum of Natural History and of its most pressing requirements. Of them the most pressing, and the one essential to rendering the collections worthy of this great empire, is 'space'. Our colonies include parts of the earth where the forms of plants and animals are the most strange. No empire in the world had ever so wide a range for the collection of the various forms of animal life as Great Britain. Never was there so much energy and intelligence displayed in the capture and transmission of exotic animals by the enterprising traveller in unknown lands and by the hardy settler in remote colonies, as by those who start from their native shores of Britain. Foreign Naturalists consequently visit England anticipating to find in her capital and in her National Museum the richest and most varied materials for their comparisons and deductions. And they ought to be in a state pre-eminently conducive to the advancement of a philosophical zoology, and on a scale commensurate with the greatness of the nation and the peculiar national facilities for such perfection. But, in order to receive and to display zoological specimens, space must be had, and not merely space for display, but for orderly display: the galleries should bear relation in size and form with the nature of the classes respectively occupying them. They should be such as to enable the student or intelligent visitor to discern the extent of the class, and to trace the kind and order of the variations which have been superinduced upon its common or fundamental characters.

— Richard Owen, President's Address to the British Association for the Advancement of Science, 1858

In 1858 a group of 120 leading scientists wrote to Benjamin Disraeli, at the time the Chancellor of the Exchequer, complaining about the inadequacy of the existing building for displaying and storing the natural history collections. (Note: Owen was not a signatory to the letter, probably because he was an employee of the museum and was reluctant to criticise his employer in public. It is likely that he orchestrated its writing.) In January 1860, the trustees of the museum approved Owen's proposal. (Only nine of the British Museum's fifty trustees supported Owen's scheme, but 33 trustees failed to turn up to the meeting. As a consequence, Owen's plan passed by nine votes to eight.) Owen envisaged a huge new building of 500,000 square feet (46,000 m^{2}) for the natural history collections, capable of exhibiting the largest specimens. Owen felt that exhibiting large animals would attract visitors to the new museum; in particular, he hoped to collect and display whole specimens of large whales while he still had the opportunity, as he felt that the larger species of whale were on the verge of extinction. (It was reported that when the Royal Commission on Scientific Instruction asked Owen how much space would be needed, he replied "I shall want space for seventy whales, to begin with".) In October 1861 Owen gave William Ewart Gladstone, the newly appointed Chancellor of the Exchequer, a tour of the cramped natural history departments of the British Museum, to demonstrate how overcrowded and poorly lit the museum's galleries and storerooms were, and to impress on him the need for a much larger building.

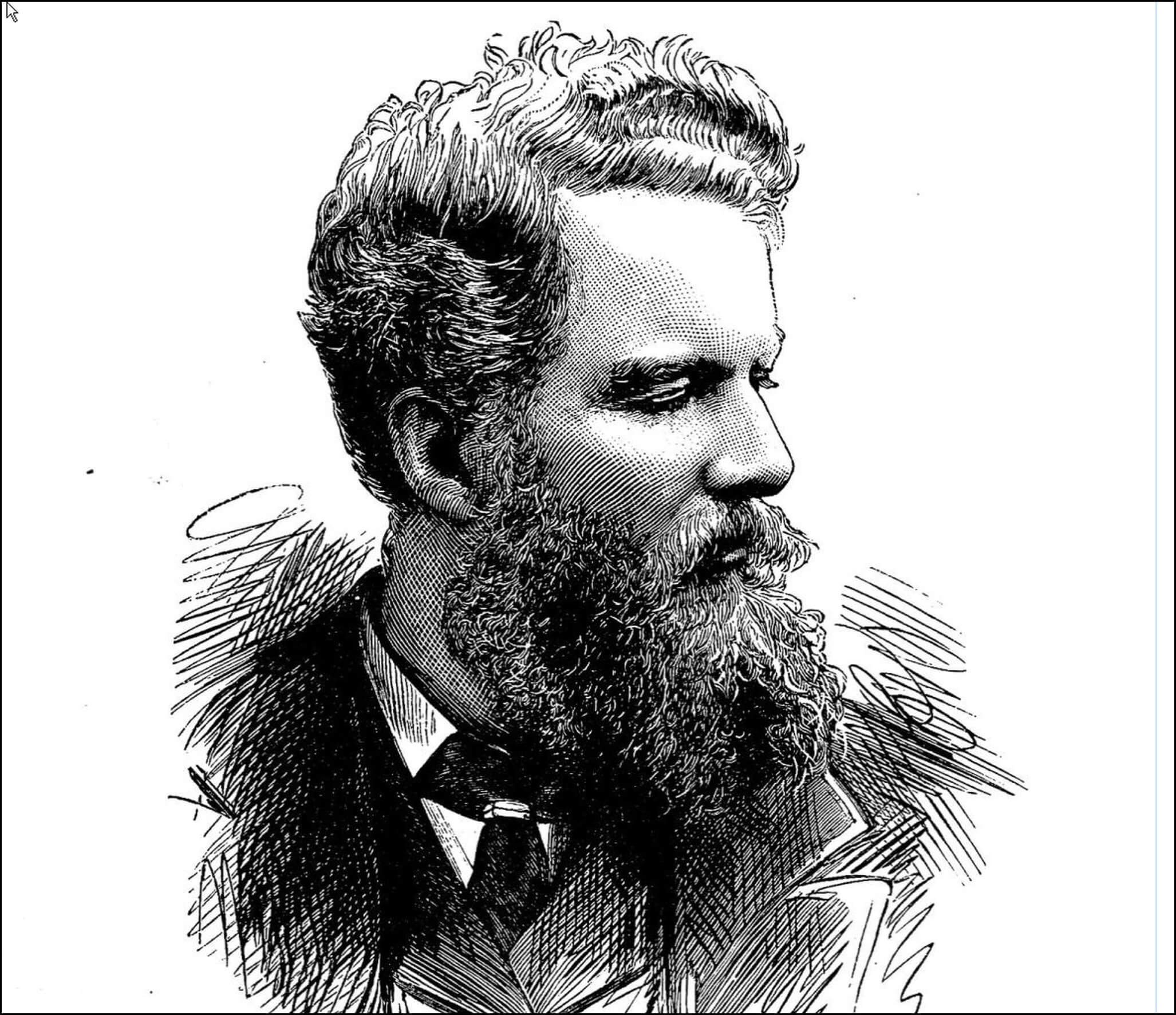
Alfred Waterhouse, 1878

After much debate over a potential site, in 1864 the site formerly occupied by the 1862 International Exhibition in South Kensington was chosen. Francis Fowke, who had designed the buildings for the International Exhibition, was commissioned to build Owen's museum. In December 1865 Fowke died, and the Office of Works commissioned little-known architect Alfred Waterhouse, who had never previously worked on a building of this scale, to complete Fowke's design. Dissatisfied with Fowke's scheme, in 1868 Waterhouse submitted his own revised design, which was endorsed by the trustees. (Note: The delay between the selection of the site in 1864 and the acceptance of Waterhouse's design in 1868 was the result of repeated changes of government; the United Kingdom had five different prime ministers during this period, each of whom had a different opinion on the controversial scheme to build a major museum in what was then a distant and relatively inaccessible suburb.)

Owen, who considered animals more important than plants, was unhappy with the museum containing botanical specimens at all, and during the negotiations that led to the new building supported transferring the botanical collections to the new Royal Botanic Gardens at Kew to amalgamate the national collections of living and preserved plants. However, he decided that it would diminish the significance of his new museum were it not to cover the whole of nature, and when the Royal Commission on Scientific Instruction was convened in 1870 to review the national policy on scientific education Owen successfully lobbied for the museum to retain its botanical collections. In 1873 construction finally began on the new museum building.

== Waterhouse's building ==
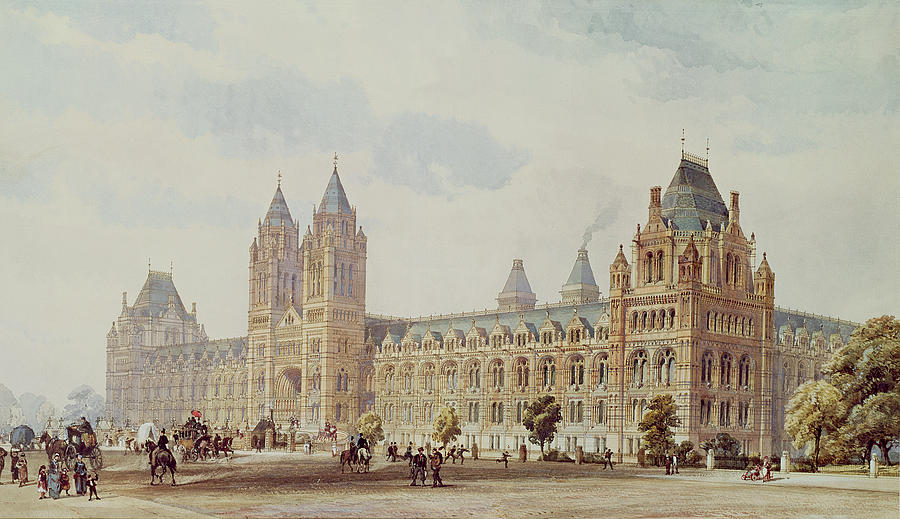
Painting by Waterhouse of the final design for the building, 1876. The arch between the central towers is the entrance to the Central Hall. The side facade at the extreme right of the painting, fronting onto what is now Exhibition Road, was never built.

Waterhouse's design was a Romanesque scheme, loosely based on German religious architecture; Owen was a leading creationist, and felt that the museum served a religious purpose in displaying the works of God. The design was centred around a very large rectangular central hall and a smaller hall to the north. Visitors would enter from the street into the Central Hall, which would hold what Owen termed an "index collection" of typical specimens, intended to serve as an introduction to the museum's collections for those unfamiliar with natural history. Extended galleries were to radiate to the east and west from this central hall to form the south face of the museum, with further galleries to the east, west and north to be added when funds allowed to complete a rectangular shape. (Note: A lack of funds meant that Waterhouse's planned east, west and north galleries were never built, and the central halls and south front were the only parts of his design to be completed. Between 1911 and 1913 plans were drawn up to build extensions to the east and west in a similar style to Waterhouse's, but the First World War meant the plans were abandoned. By the time funds became available for further expansion in the late 20th century, Waterhouse's style was out of fashion, and later additions to the museum are in a radically different architectural style.)

Uniquely for the time, Waterhouse's building was faced inside and out with terracotta, the first building in England to be so designed; although expensive to build, this was resistant to the acid rain of heavily polluted London, allowed the building to be washed clean, (Note: Waterhouse chose terracotta because it was washable, but for much of the museum's history the exterior was never cleaned, giving the building a reputation for ugliness. It was only in 1975 that the exterior was fully washed, restoring it to Waterhouse and Owen's intended appearance.) and also allowed it to be decorated with intricate mouldings and sculptures. A smaller North Hall, immediately north of the Central Hall, would be used for exhibits specifically relating to British natural history. (Note: The use of the smaller North Hall for the exhibition of British natural history was controversial. Henry Woodward, the Keeper of the geological department, felt that this would be the topic of the most interest to visitors, and that as a consequence it should be in the more prominent Central Hall.) On 18 April 1881 the new British Museum (Natural History) opened to the public. As relocating exhibits from Bloomsbury was a difficult and time-consuming process, much of the building remained empty at the time the museum opened.

== Central Hall ==
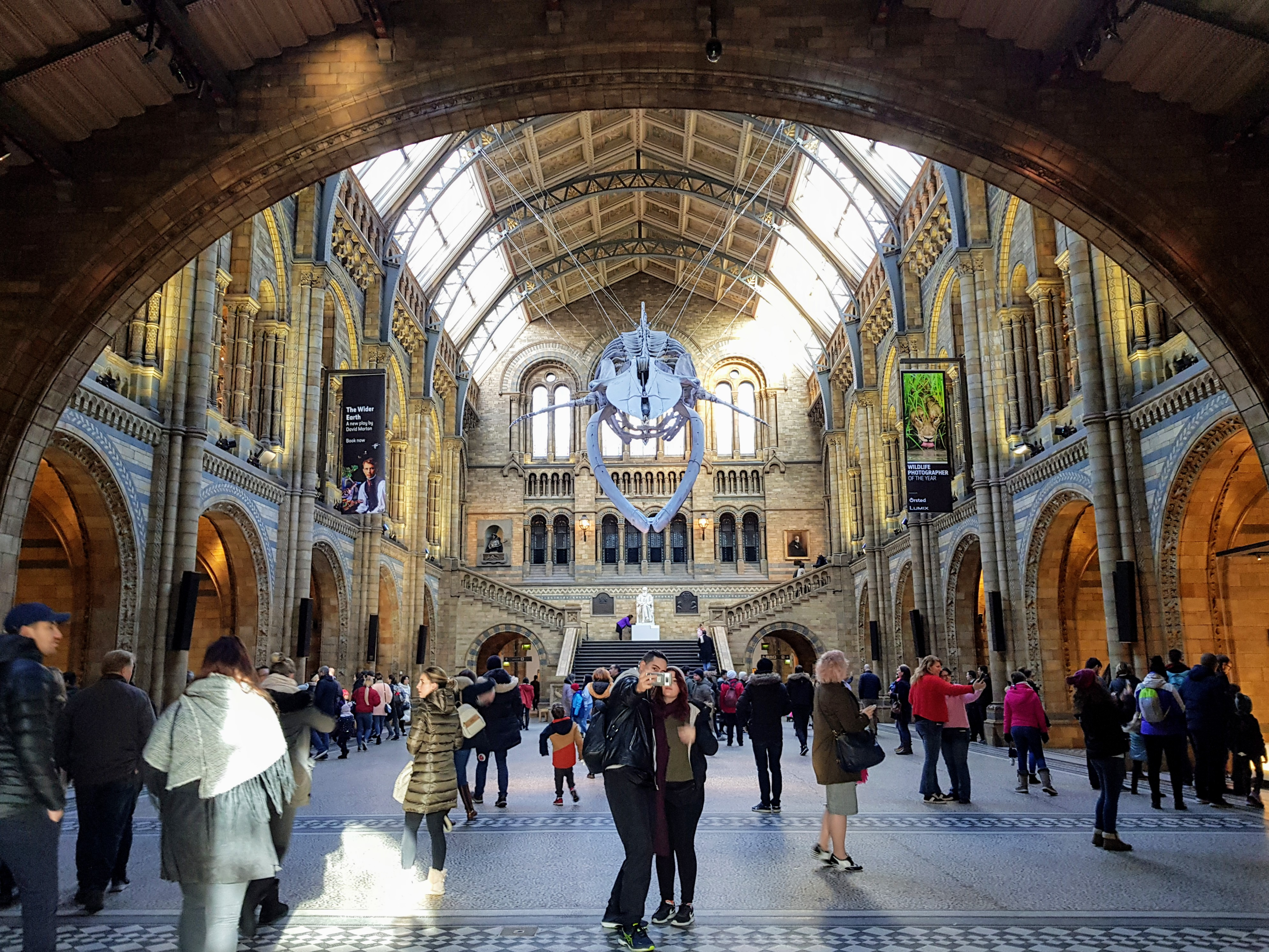
Being above the skylights meant that the ceiling was dimly lit. As it could be viewed from both the distant floor and the much higher balconies, the design needed to be aesthetically pleasing at both long and short distances.

As well as being large, the Central Hall was to be very high, rising the full 72-foot (22 m) height of the building to a plaster-lined mansard roof, with skylights running the length of the hall at the junction between the roof and the wall. A grand staircase at the northern end of the hall, flanked by archways leading to the smaller North Hall, led to balconies running almost the full length of the hall to a staircase which in turn led to a large landing above the main entrance, such that a visitor entering the hall would walk the full length of the floor of the hall to reach the first staircase, and then the full length of the balcony to reach the second. As a consequence, it posed a difficulty to Waterhouse's plans to decorate the building. As the skylights were lower than the ceiling the roof was in relative darkness compared to the rest of the room, and owing to the routes to be taken by visitors, the design needed to be attractive when viewed both from the floor below, and from the raised balconies to the each side. To address this, Waterhouse decided to decorate the 170-foot (52 m) ceiling with painted botanical panels.

The lower panels will have representations of foliage treated conventionally. The upper panels will be treated with more variety of colour and the designs will be of an archaic character. The chief idea to be represented is that of growth. The colours will be arranged so that the most brilliant will be near the apex of the roof.

— Alfred Waterhouse, June 1876

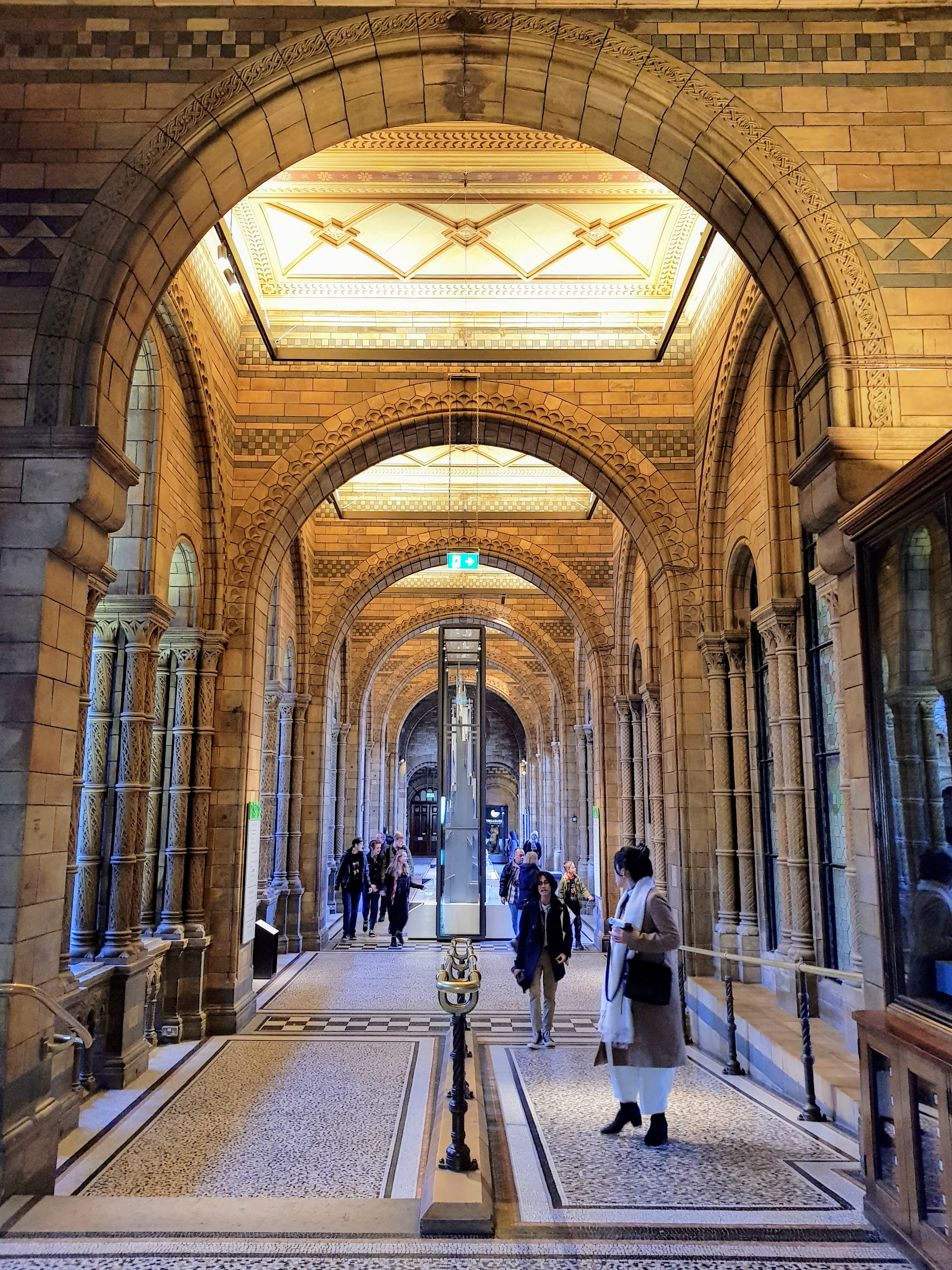
One of the identical twin balconies running the length of Central Hall, connecting the first and second staircases

Acton Smee Ayrton, the First Commissioner of Works, was hostile to the museum project, and sought to cut costs wherever possible; he disliked art, and felt that it was his responsibility to restrain the excesses of artists and architects. Having already insisted that Waterhouse's original design for wooden ceilings and a lead roof be replaced with cheaper plaster and slate, Ayrton vetoed Waterhouse's plan to decorate the ceiling. Waterhouse eventually persuaded Ayrton that provided the ceiling were decorated while the scaffolding from its construction remained in place, a decorated ceiling would be no more expensive than a plain white one. He prepared two sample paintings of the pomegranate and magnolia for Ayrton, who approved £1435 (about £140,000 in 2025 terms) to decorate the ceiling. Having obtained approval for the paintings, Waterhouse managed to convince Ayrton that the paintings' appeal would be enhanced if certain elements were gilded.

Records do not survive of how the plants to be represented were chosen and who created the initial designs. Knapp & Press (2005) believe that it was almost certainly Waterhouse himself, likely working from specimens in the museum's botanical collections, while William T. Stearn, writing in 1980, believes that the illustrations were chosen by botanist William Carruthers, who at the time was the museum's Keeper of Botany. To create the painted panels from the initial cartoons, Waterhouse commissioned Manchester artist Charles James Lea of Best & Lea, with whom he had already worked on Pilmore Hall in Hurworth-on-Tees. Waterhouse provided Lea with a selection of botanical drawings, and requested that Lea "select and prepare drawings of fruits and flowers most suitable and gild same in the upper panels of the roof"; it is not recorded who drew the cartoons for the paintings, or how the species were chosen. Best & Lea agreed a fee of £1975 (about £190,000 in 2025 terms) for the work. How the panels were painted is not recorded, but it is likely Lea painted directly onto the ceiling from the scaffolding.

=== Main ceiling ===
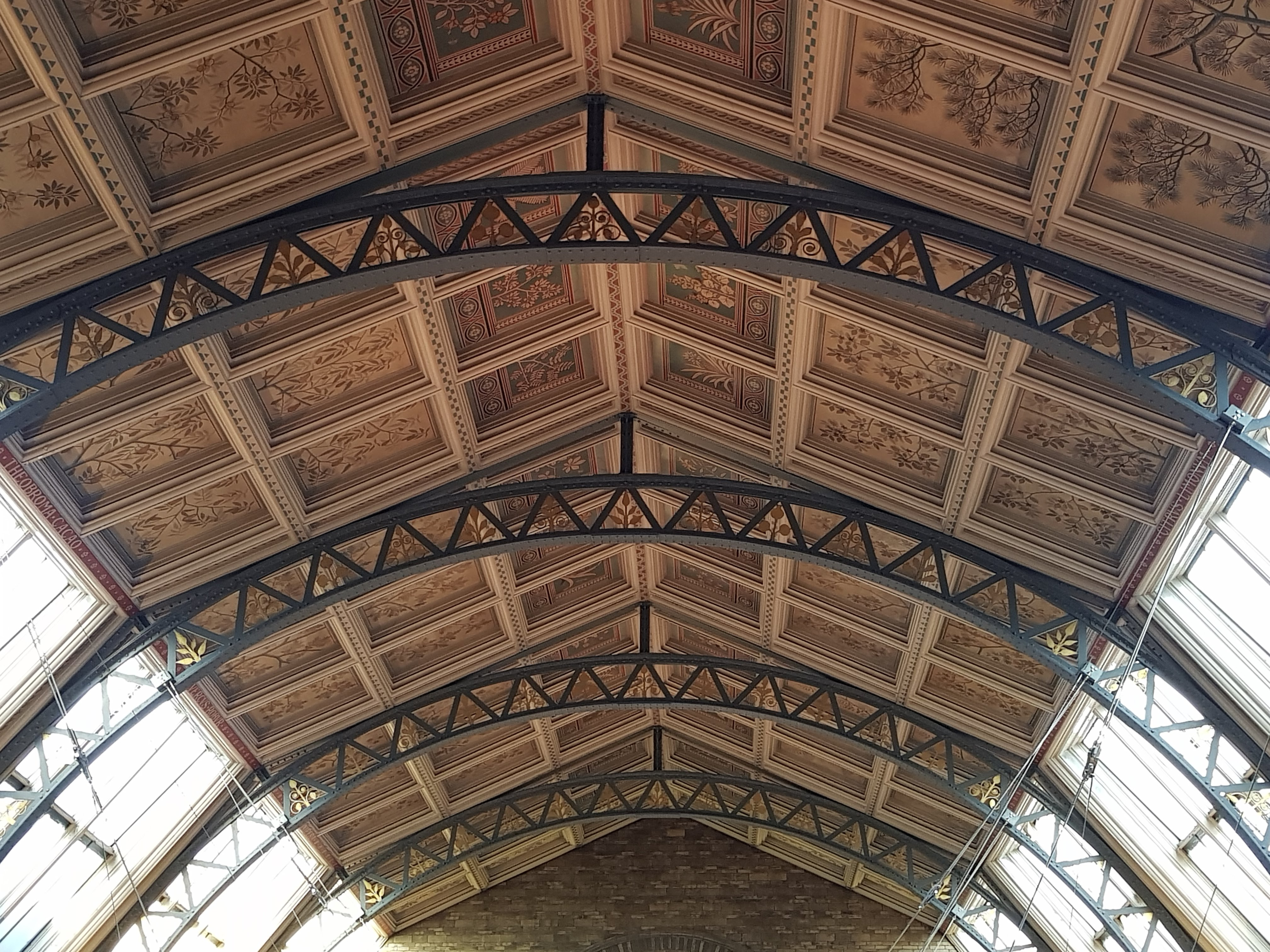
Three long rows of panels on each side rise from the skylights to meet at the roof's apex. The supporting girders are themselves decorated with gilded leaves.

Waterhouse and Lea's design for the ceiling is based on a theme of growth and power. From the skylights on each side, three rows of panels run the length of the main hall, with the third, uppermost rows on each side meeting at the apex of the roof. The two lower rows are divided into blocks of six panels apiece, each block depicting a different plant species. Plants spread their branches upwards towards the apex, representing the theme of growth. The supporting girders of the ceiling are spaced at every third column of panels, dividing the panels into square blocks of nine; the girders are an integral part of the design, designed to be barely visible from the ground but highly visible from the upper galleries, representing industry working with nature.

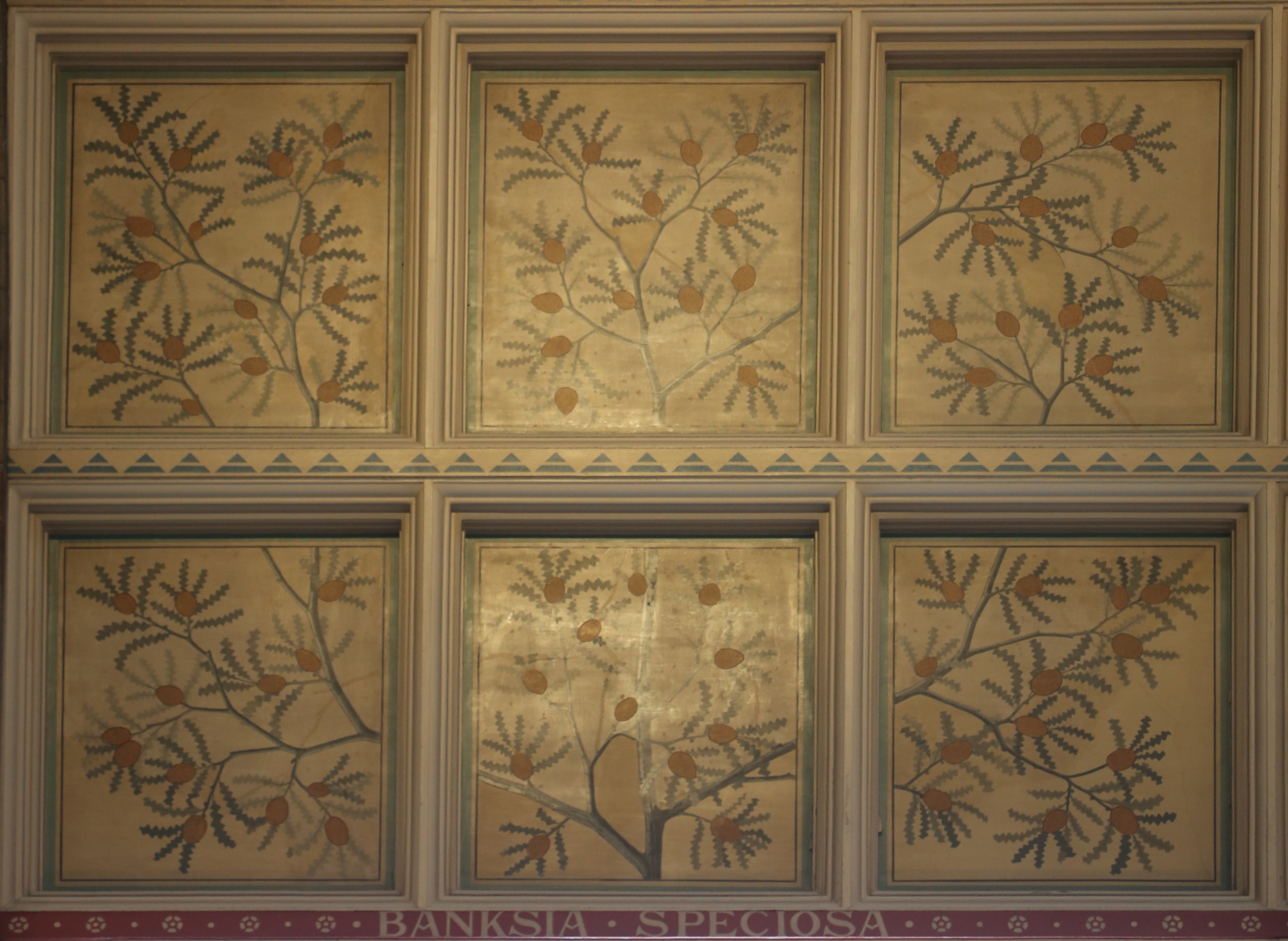
The six panels depicting Banksia speciosa

The girders themselves are based on 12th-century German architecture. Each comprises a round arch, braced with repeating triangles to create a zig-zag pattern. Within each upward-facing triangle is a highly stylised gilded leaf; the six different leaf designs repeat across the length of the hall. Running perpendicular to the girders—i.e., along the length of the hall—are seven iron support beams. The topmost of these forms the apex of the roof, and the next beam down on each side, separating the topmost from the middle row of panels, is painted with a geometric design of cream and green rectangles. The next beam down on each side, separating the middle from the lowest row of panels, is decorated in the same shades of cream and green, but this time with a design of green triangles pointing upwards. The lowest of the beams, separating the panels from the skylights, is painted deep burgundy and is labelled with the scientific name of the plant depicted in the panels above; the names are flanked with a motif of gilt dots and highly stylised roses. At Owen's request, the plants were labelled with their binomial names rather than their English names, as he felt this would serve an educational purpose to visitors.

Other than on the outermost edges of the panels at the two ends of the hall, each set of nine panels is flanked alongside the girders by an almost abstract design of leaves; these decorations continue along the space between the skylights and the girders to reach the terracotta walls below, providing a visible connection between the walls and the ceiling designs.

Between the main entrance and the landing of the main staircase, the lower two rows of panels all have a pale cream background, intended to draw the viewer's attention to the plant being illustrated; each plant chosen was considered significant either to visitors, or to the museum itself. Each block of three columns depicts a different species, but all have a broadly similar design. The central column in the lowest row depicts the trunk or stalk of the plant in question, while the panels on either side and the three panels of the row above depict the branches of the plant spreading from the lower central panel. The design was intended to draw the viewer's eye upwards, and to give the impression that the plants are growing.

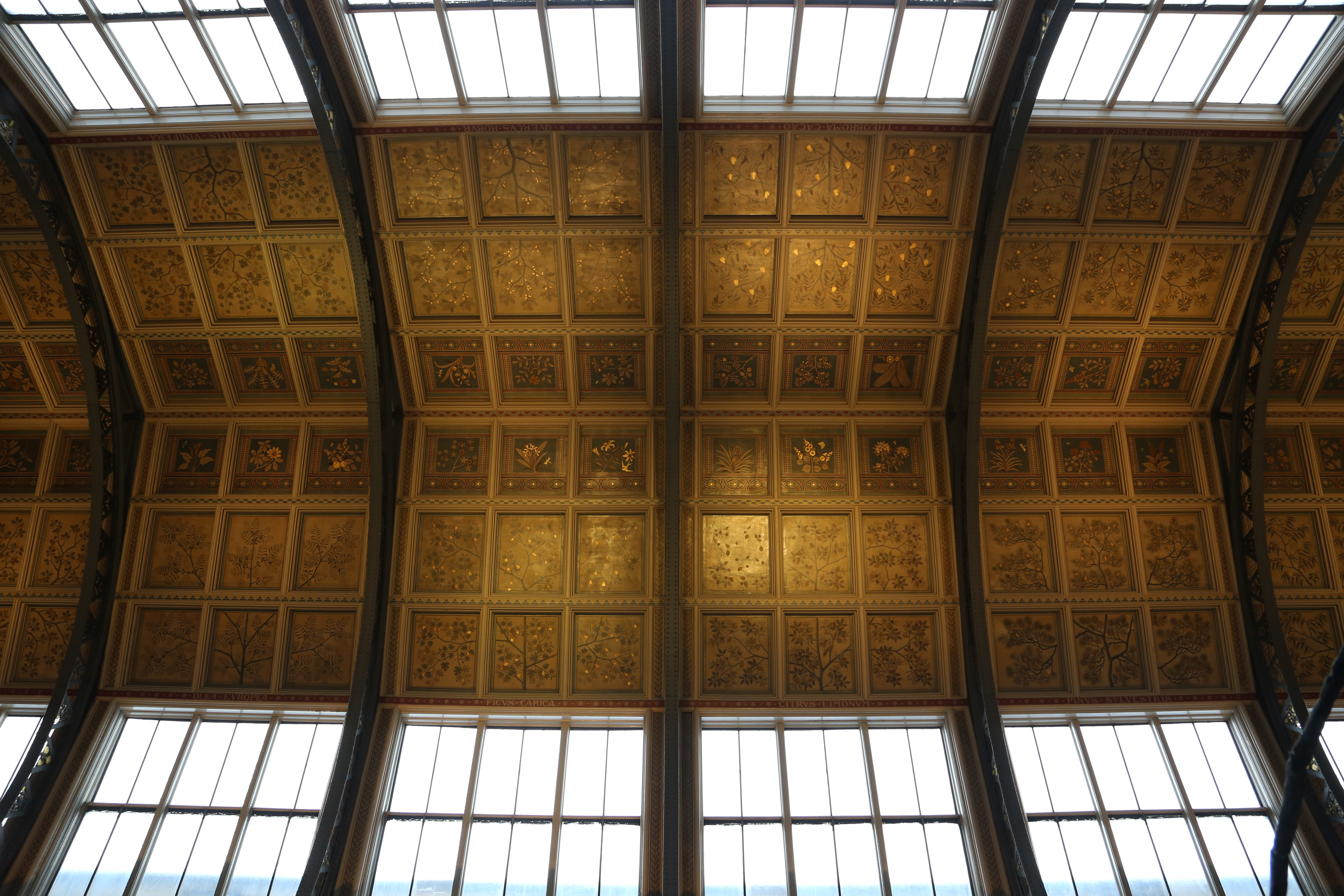
Layout of the skylights and panels

==== Archaic panels ====
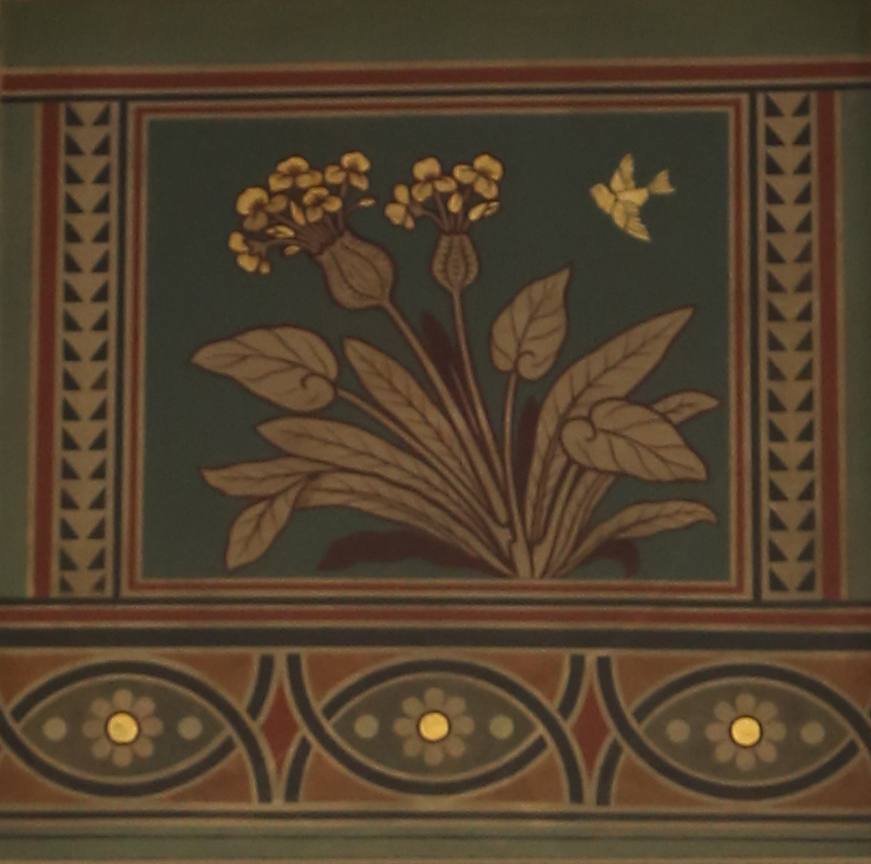
Archaic panel depicting Ottelia and a stylised bird

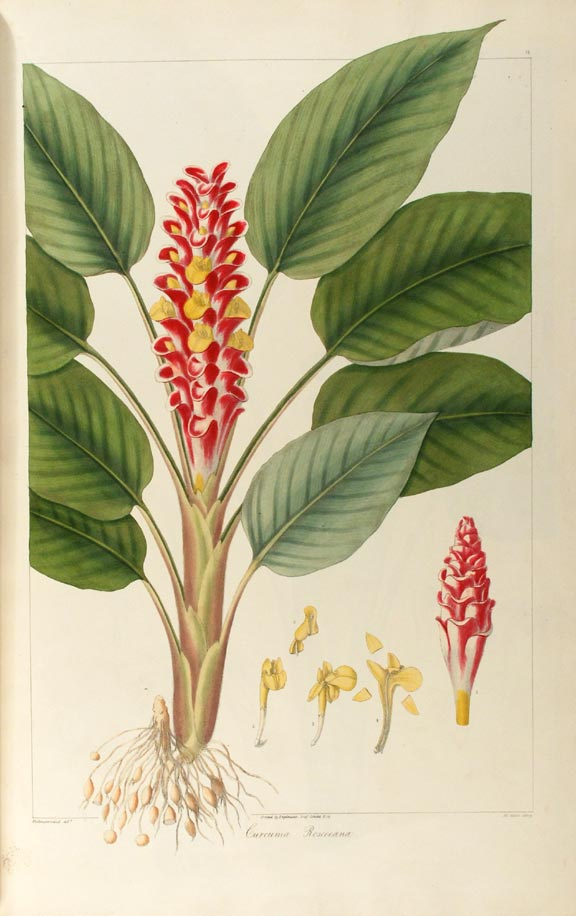
Curcuma, Nathaniel Wallich (1832)

Above the six-panel sets and adjacent to the apex of the roof lie the top rows of panels. These panels, called the "archaic" panels by Waterhouse, are of a radically different design to those below. Each panel is surrounded by gilded strips and set against a dark green background, rather than the pale cream of the six-panel sets; the archaic panels also continue beyond the six panel sets and over the landing of the main staircase, to run the full length of the Central Hall.

The archaic panels depict flattened, stylised plants in pale colours with gilt highlighting, sometimes accompanied by birds, butterflies and insects. Unlike the six-panel sets the archaic panels are not labelled, and while some plants on the archaic panels are recognisable others are stylised beyond recognition.

No records survive of how Waterhouse and Lea selected the designs for the archaic panels, or on from which images they were derived. Owing to the flattened nature of the designs, it is possible that they were based on pressed flowers in the museum's herbarium, or on illustrations in the British Museum's collection of books on botany. Some of the archaic panels appear to be simplified versions of the illustrations in Nathaniel Wallich's book Plantae Asiaticae Rariores.

=== Balconies ===
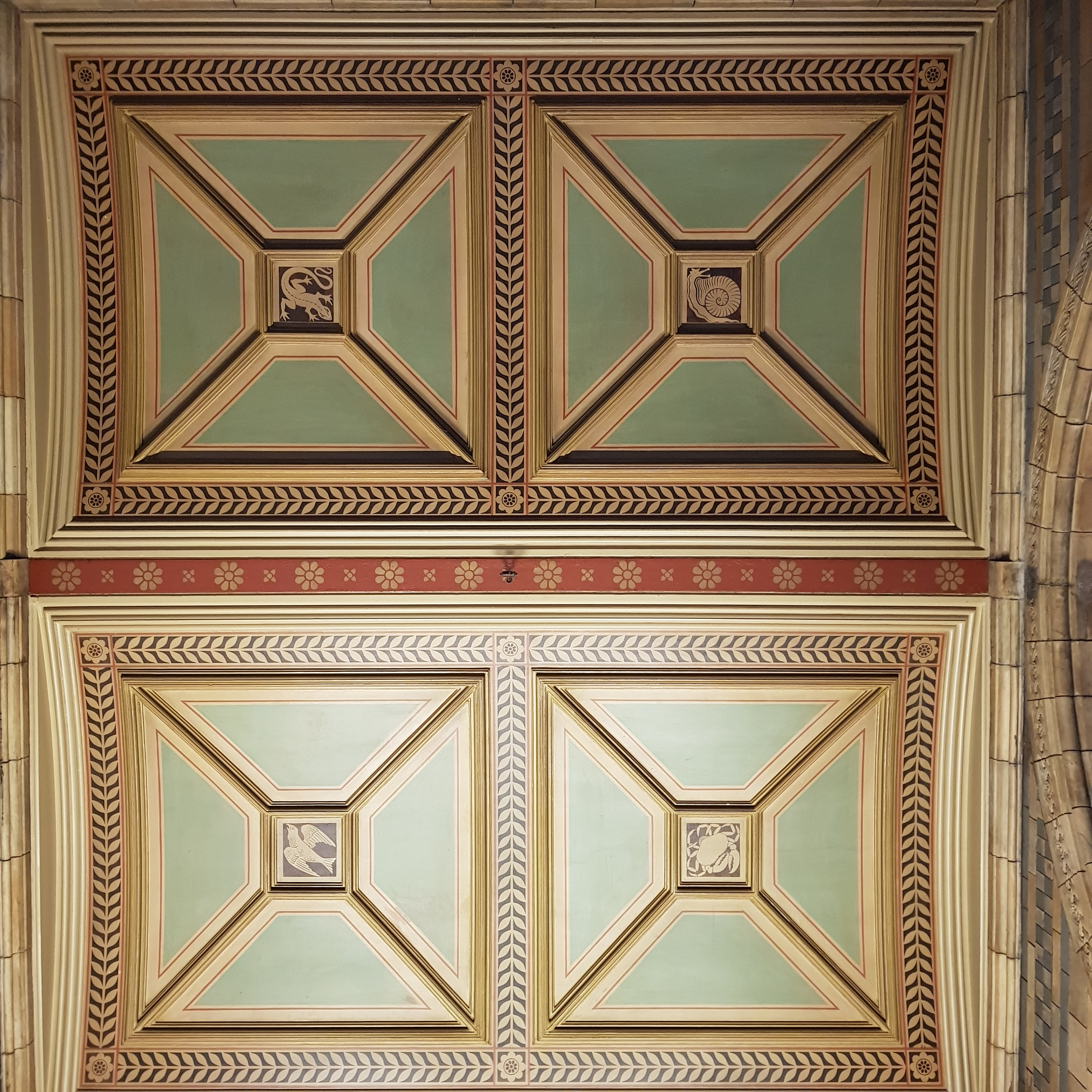
Panels from the balcony ceiling, with a lizard, snail, bird and crab

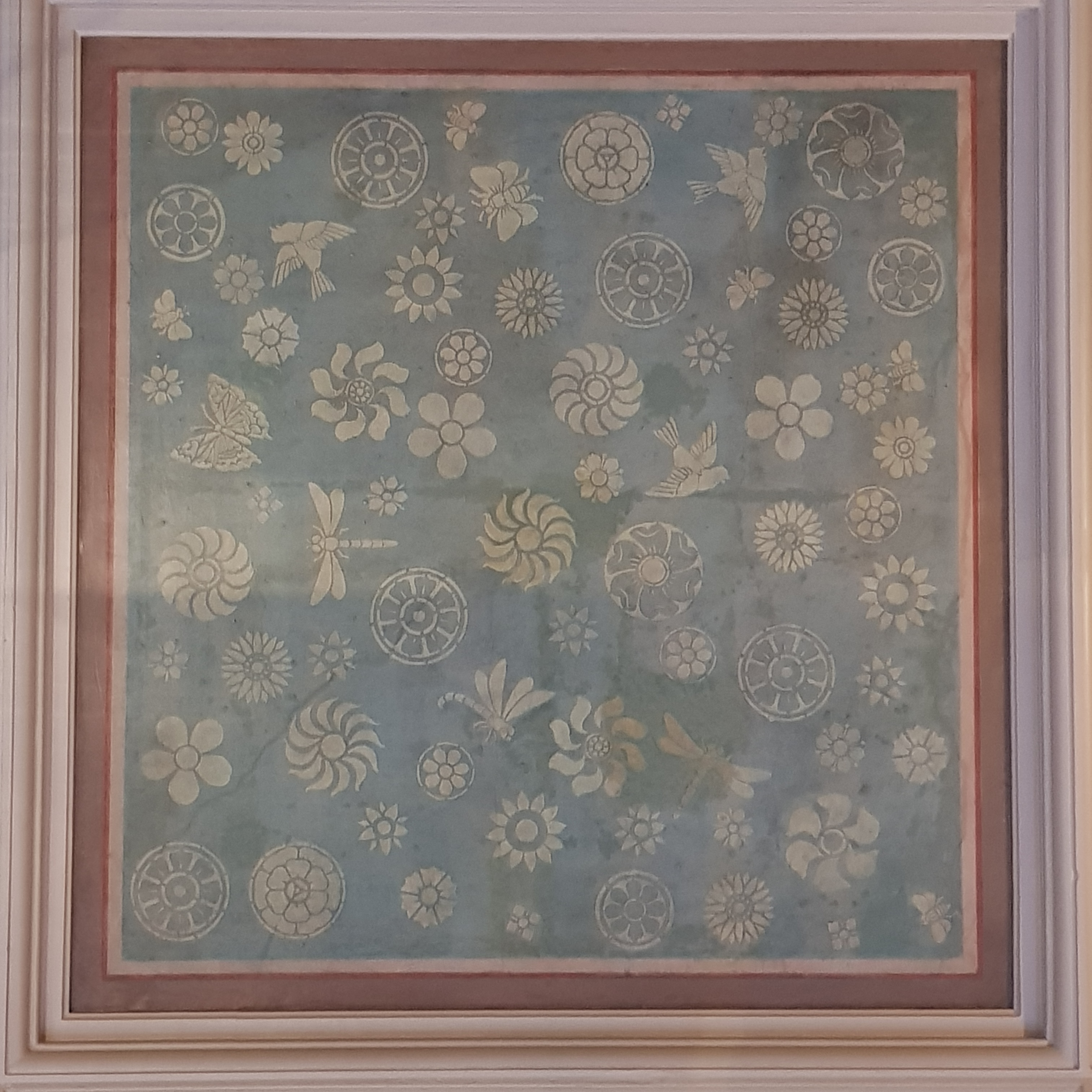
A northern lobby ceiling depicting birds, insects, butterflies and paterae

The ceiling of the balconies flanking the Central Hall are also decorated, albeit to a far more simple design. The ceilings are painted with a stencilled motif of square panels, each containing a small illustration of a different plant or animal. All the birds and insects from the archaic panels are included; the panels also feature cacti, cockatoos, crabs, daisies, fish, hawks, lizards, octopuses, pinecones, pomegranates, snails and snakes. The ceilings of the lobbies at the northern end of each balcony—originally the entrances to the museum's refreshment room—are each decorated with a single large panel of stencilled birds, insects, butterflies and paterae.

=== South landing ===
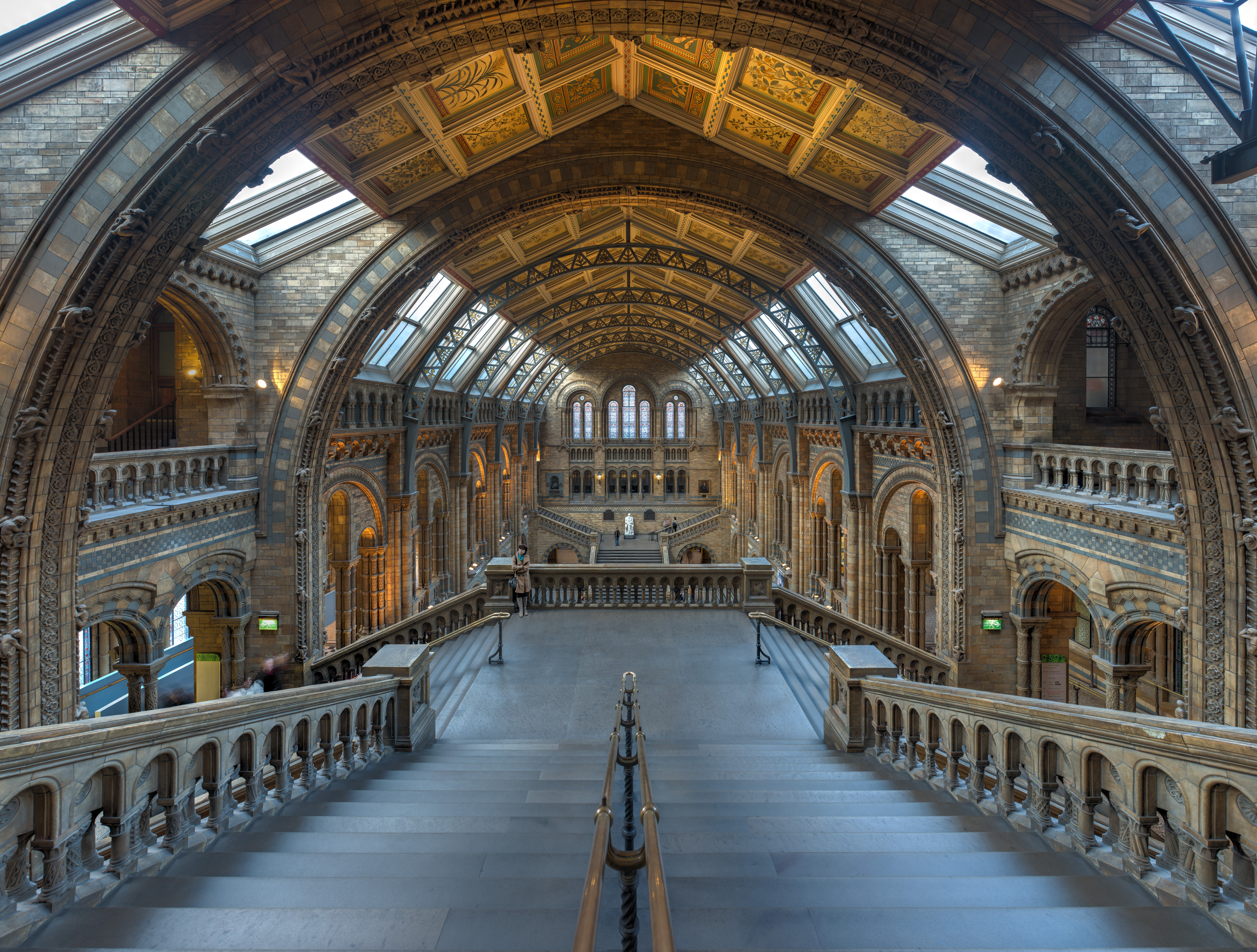
Unlike the intentionally exposed girders of the main hall, the supporting arches above the landing are enclosed within terracotta facing.

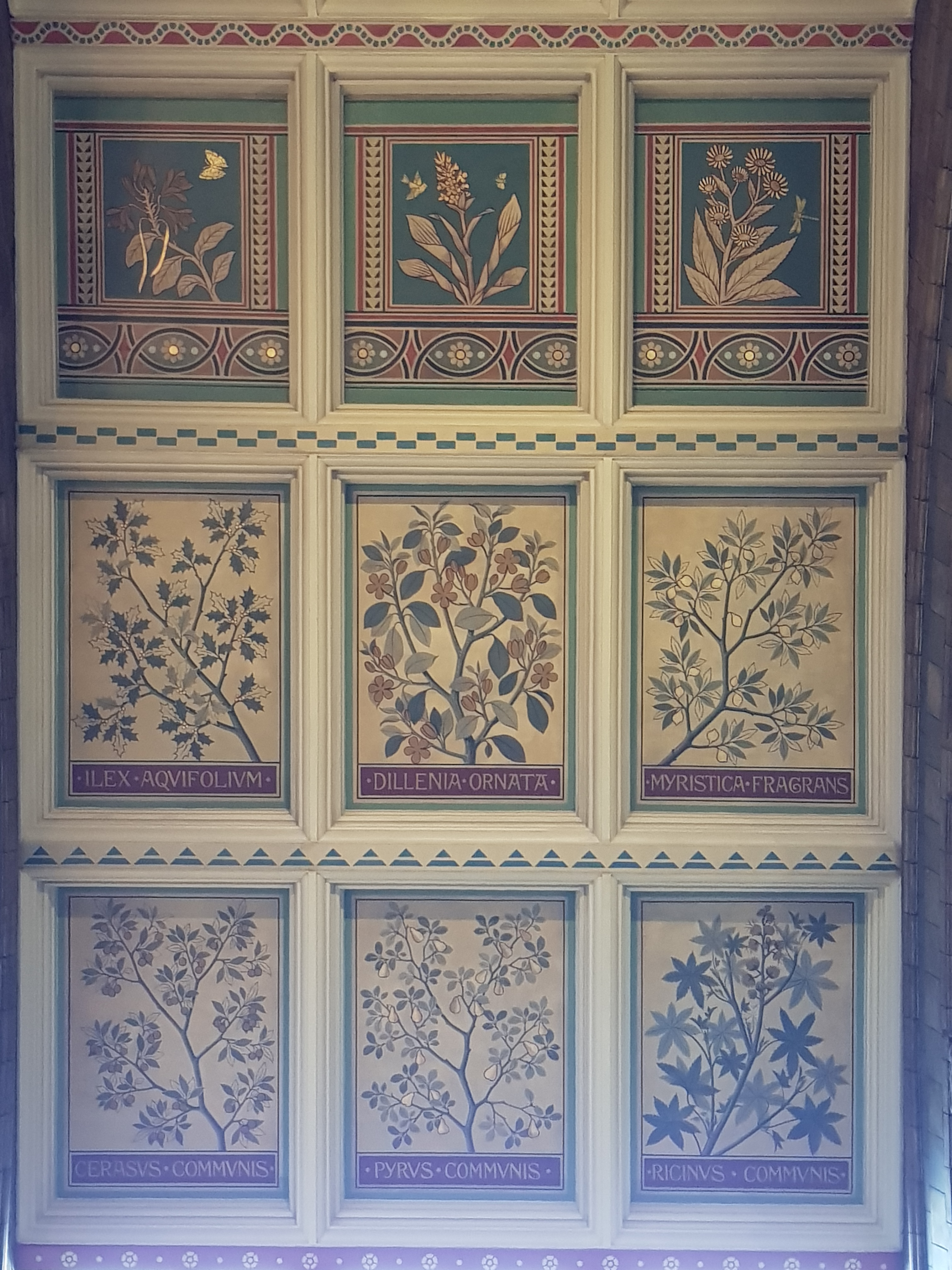
A nine-panel set from above the landing. The archaic panels' style remains the same, but each lower panel depicts a separate species.

Unlike the cavernous, intentionally cathedral-like feel of the main space of the Central Hall, the ceiling of the landing above the main entrance, connecting the balconies to the upper level, has a different design. Instead of the exposed and decorated iron girders of the main space, the structural girders of this end of the building are faced in the same terracotta style as the building's walls. As the structure of the landing and staircases meant that the ceiling at this end of the room was not clearly visible from the ground floor, there was less of a need to make the designs appear attractive from far below; instead, the design of this stretch of the ceiling was intended to be viewed from a relatively close distance.

As with the rest of the Hall, the ceiling is still divided into blocks of nine panels. The archaic panels still run the full length, providing a thematic and visual connection with the rest of the ceiling. The six lower panels of each set do not depict a single plant spreading across each set of panels; instead, each of the 36 panels in the lower two rows depicts a different plant. These each represent a plant considered of particular significance to the British Empire.

== North Hall ==
Archways flanking the northern staircase to the balcony level lead to the North Hall, intended by Owen for a display of the natural history of the United Kingdom. Waterhouse designed a ceiling for the North Hall representing this theme. As with the Central Hall, this ceiling comprises rows of panels above a long skylight along each side of the room; there are two rows per side rather than three, and nine panels on each row. Unlike the archaic panels in the top row of the Central Hall, the upper rows on each side consist of plain green panels, each containing a heraldic rose, thistle or shamrock in representation of England, Scotland and Ireland, the three nations then constituting the constituent parts of the United Kingdom. (Wales was not represented, as in this period it was considered a part of England.)

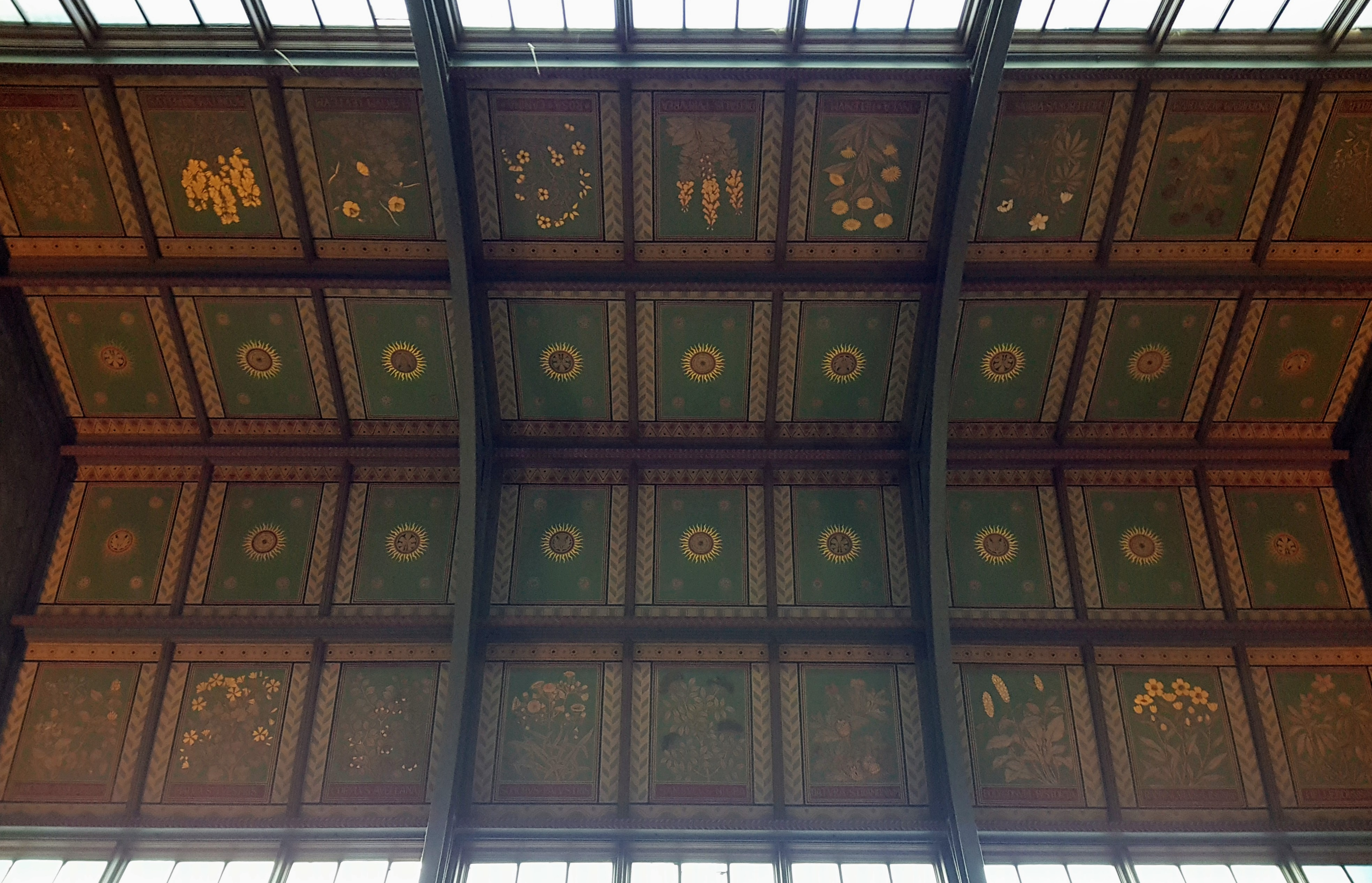
The ceiling of the smaller North Hall depicts native British plants against a green background.

In keeping with Owen's intent that the room be used for a display on the topic of the British Isles, the nine lower panels on each side each illustrate a different plant found in Britain or Ireland. (Note: It is now known that five of the 18 plants depicted in the North Hall are not native to the British Isles but were introduced by humans.) The plants depicted were chosen to illustrate the variety of plant habitats in the British Isles. (Note: The only significant habitat type found in the British Isles not represented on the North Hall ceiling is moorland.) Uniquely in the building, the ceiling panels of the North Hall make use of silver leaf as well as gilt. (During conservation work in 2016 it was found that initially some panels in the Central Hall had also made use of silver leaf, but the silver sections had subsequently been overpainted with ochre.) The style of illustration is similar to that of those over the south landing, but instead of the pale backgrounds of the main ceiling and the panels above the landing, the illustrations in the North Hall are set against a dark green background; Waterhouse's intent was that the darker colour scheme would create an intimate feel by making the ceiling appear lower.

One of the last parts of the initial museum to be completed, the display of British natural history in the North Hall was somewhat arbitrary, and did not reflect Owen's original intentions. Stuffed native animals such as birds and rats were exhibited, alongside prize-winning racehorses, common domesticated animals such as cows and ducks, and an exhibit on commonly grown crops and garden vegetables and on the control of insects. The display was unsuccessful, and was later removed, (Note: The museum eventually opened a more coherent display on the natural history of Britain in a second floor gallery.) with the North Hall used as a space for temporary exhibitions before eventually becoming the museum's cafeteria. (Note: The original refreshment room had been on the balcony level between the Central and North Halls. It was illuminated by large stained glass windows overlooking both Halls.)

== After completion ==
The walls and the ceilings are decorated, as befits a Palace of Nature, with all the varieties of animal and vegetable life, and the more striking fossil remains ... Not the least admirable part of the plan is the great central hall, to be furnished and ornamented as an index to the contents of the museum. Though its proportions are magnificent, it will only be an epitome of the whole collection. The idea seems to have been suggested by the Reference Library of 60,000 volumes in the Reading Room of the British Museum, which this hall will almost equal in size, though of a very different form. We are sure that Londoners will be very glad to hear that they have now the opportunity of pursuing the most delightful of all studies in a true Temple of Nature, showing, as it should, the Beauty of Holiness.

— The Times on the opening of the Natural History Museum, 18 April 1881

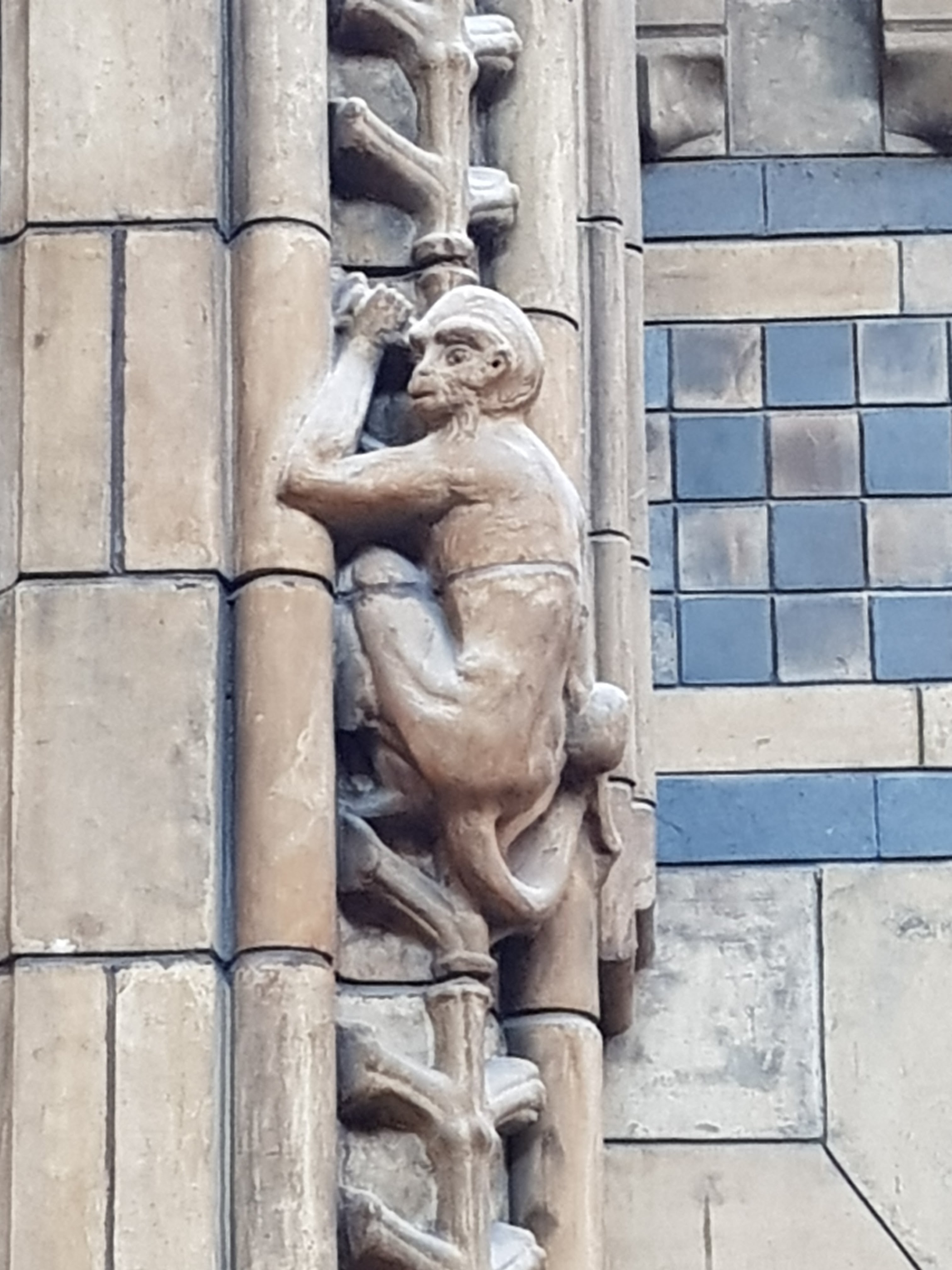
A terracotta monkey on a supporting column in the Central Hall

Although the terracotta decorations of the museum do contain some botanical motifs, most of the decor of the building with the exception of the ceiling depicts animals, with extinct species depicted on the east wing and extant species on the west. (Note: The sculptures on the interior and exterior of the building reflect the original layout of its displays. Those parts of the building east of the Central Hall were intended by Owen and Waterhouse to be used for geological specimens, and are decorated with sculptures of extinct species known only from fossils; those parts to the west were to be used for the display of extant species, and are decorated with sculptures of living plants and animals. The division is not absolute; bats are depicted on the east wing among extinct species, while ammonites are depicted among the living species on the west wing.) A statue of Adam originally stood between the two wings over the main entrance, celebrating humanity as the peak of creation, but was dislodged during the Second World War and not replaced. (Note: In Waterhouse's initial design the main entrance was topped with statues of both Adam and Eve, but after his original plan for a level parapet was replaced by a gable, mounting two statues became impractical and only Adam was included.) Much was written at the time of the museum's opening about the terracotta decorations of the museum, but very little was written about how the ceiling was received. Knapp & Press (2005) speculate that the apparent lack of public interest in the design of the ceiling could be owing to the prevalence of William Morris's ornate floral wallpaper and fabric designs rendering the decorations of the ceiling less unusual to Victorian audiences than might be expected.

=== Deterioration, restoration and conservation ===
During the construction of the building Waterhouse had been under intense pressure from the trustees to cut costs, and consequently was forced to abandon his proposed wooden ceiling. Instead, beneath a slate roof, the ceilings were constructed of lath and plaster. The ribs that frame the panels were reinforced with animal hair, but the panels themselves were not reinforced. As a consequence, the ceiling panels are unusually susceptible to vibration and to expansion and contraction caused by temperature variations.

The elaborate nature of the building's design means that its roof slopes at multiple angles, with numerous gutters and gullies, all of which are easily blocked by leaves and wind-blown detritus. As such, during periods of heavy rainfall water often penetrates the slate roof and reaches the fragile plaster ceiling. In 1924 and 1975, the museum has been obliged to repair and restore the ceilings owing to water damage. The height of the Central Hall ceiling made this a complicated and expensive process, requiring floor-to-ceiling scaffolding across the length and width of the Central Hall. The need to avoid damage to the fragile mosaic flooring and the terracotta tiling on the walls caused further difficulty in erecting the scaffolding. The exact nature and the cost of the repairs conducted in 1924 and 1975 is unknown, as is the identity of the restorers, as the relevant records have been lost, although it is known that cracks in the ceiling were filled with plaster and the paintwork and gilding retouched; it is possible that some of the panels were replaced entirely.

During the Second World War, South Kensington was heavily bombed. The north, east, south and west of the building sustained direct bomb hits; the east wing in particular suffered severe damage and its upper floor was left a burned-out shell. The bombs missed the centre of the museum, leaving the fragile ceilings of the Central and North Halls undamaged.

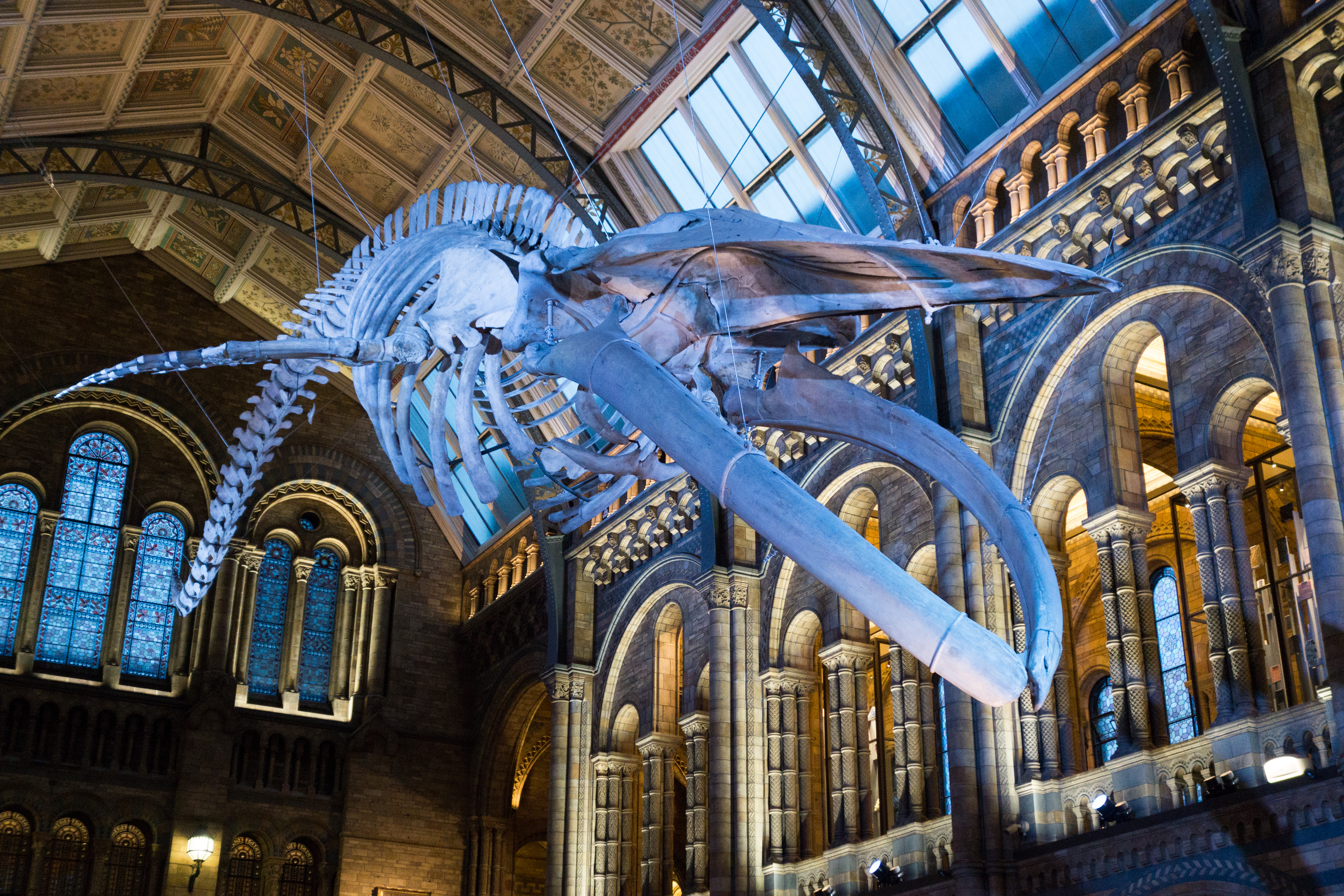
In 2017 a blue whale skeleton was suspended from the ceiling of the recently renamed Hintze Hall, replacing the "Dippy" Diplodocus cast which had stood there for many years.

Since the 1975 restoration the ceiling once more began to deteriorate, individual sections of plaster becoming unkeyed (detached from their underlying laths), paintwork peeling from some panels, and the delicate plasterwork cracking. The ends of the Central Hall suffered the worst deterioration, with some cracks above the landing and the northern end of the hall becoming large enough to be visible to the naked eye, while the gilding in the North Hall became gradually tarnished.

In 2001 a systematic programme for the conservation of the ceilings was instituted. A specialised hoist is regularly used to allow a surveyor to take high resolution photographs of each panel from a close distance, and the images of each panel used to create a time series for each panel. This permits staff to monitor the condition of each panel for deterioration.

In 2014, following a £5,000,000 donation from businessman Michael Hintze, Central Hall was formally renamed Hintze Hall. In 2016, in conjunction with works to replace the "Dippy" cast of a Diplodocus skeleton which had previously been the Central Hall's centrepiece with the skeleton of a blue whale suspended from the ceiling, further conservation work took place. The cracks in the plasterwork were filled, and flaked or peeling paintwork was repaired with Japanese tissue.

== Layout of the ceiling panels ==
=== Central Hall panels ===
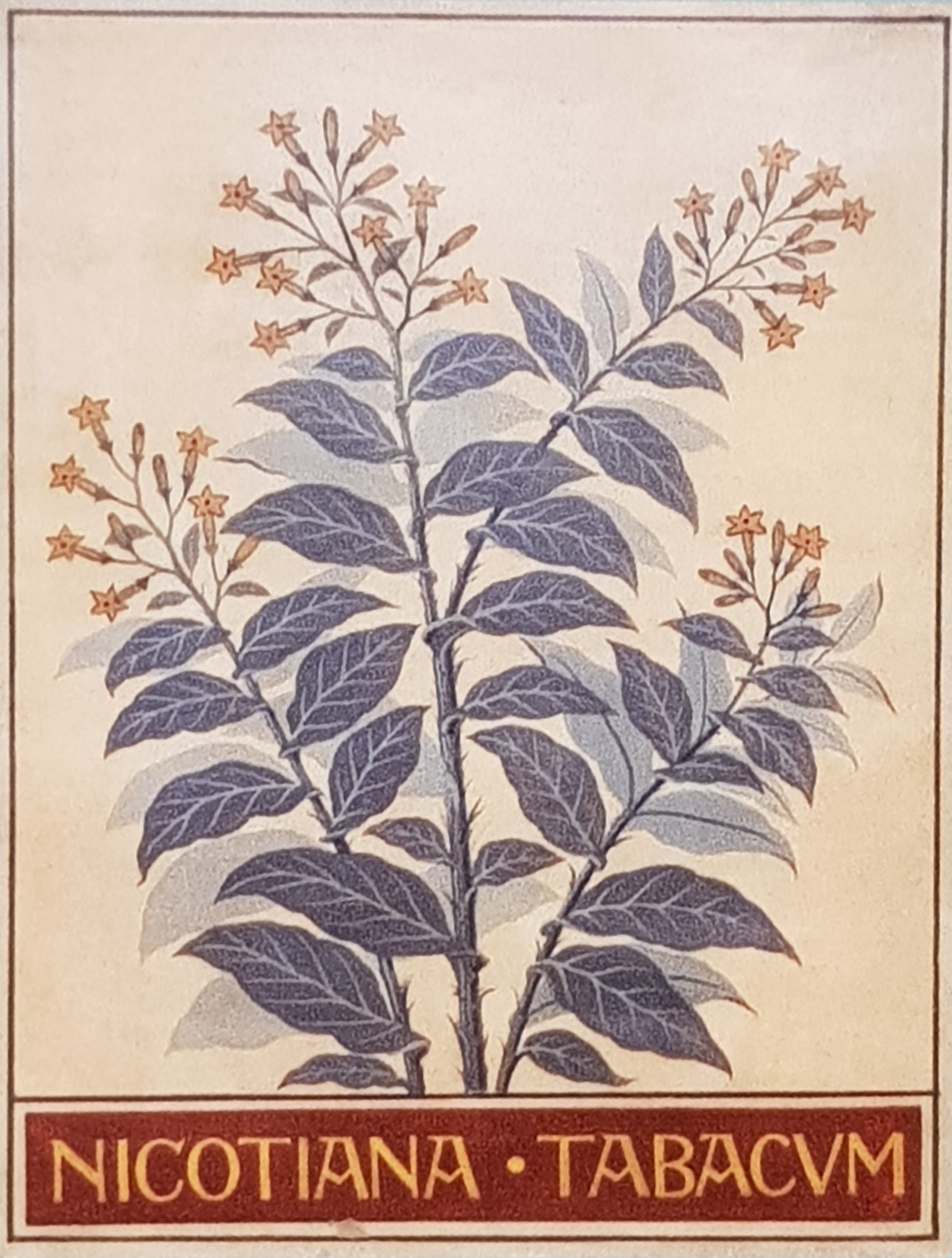
Nicotiana tabacum as pictured on the ceiling

The panels are arranged in blocks of nine. The two central, uppermost rows (55–108) constitute the archaic panels. Of the outer two rows, in the six blocks at the southern end of the hall above the landing and the main entrance (1–18 and 109–126) each panel depicts a different plant considered of particular significance to the British Empire, while the twelve six-panel blocks above the main hall (19–54 and 127–162) each depict a single plant considered of particular importance to visitors or to the history of the museum, spreading across six panels.

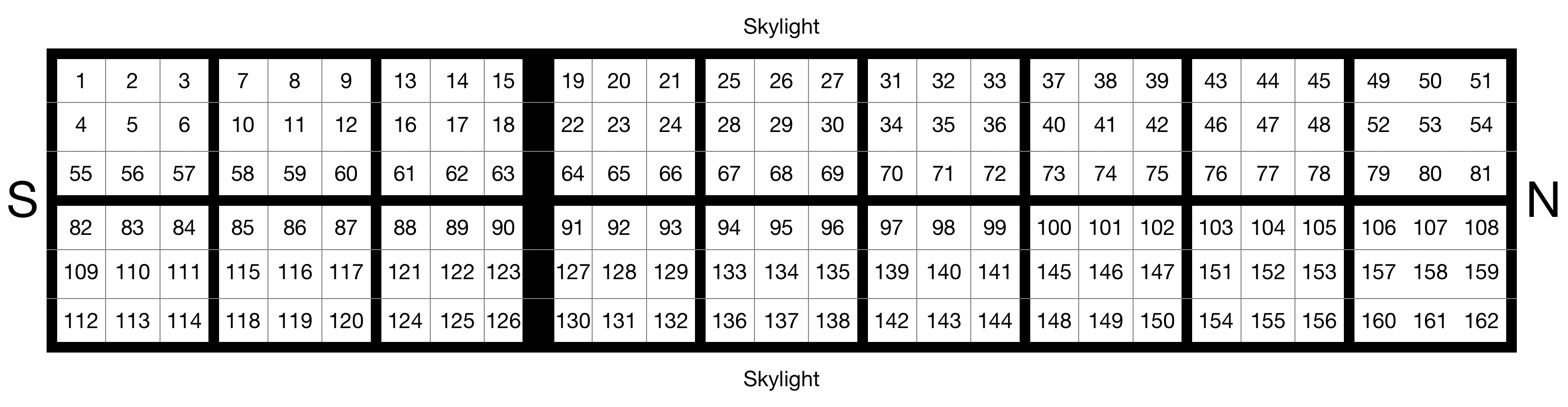

1	Garcinia hanburyi, a variety of gamboge tree (misspelled on the ceiling as Garcinia hanburyii). Gamboge trees were the traditional source of gamboge, the dark yellow pigment of the clothing worn by Buddhist monks.
2	Pyrus indica (now Docynia indica), the Indian pear. Native to South and Southeast Asia, the fruit is used to produce juice, wine and related products.
3	Cornus capitata, the evergreen dogwood, was a popular ornamental plant.
4	Coffea arabica, the Arabian coffee plant, was the main cultivar of coffee. Coffee had been one of Britain's most popular drinks since being introduced to Britain from the Middle East by Venetian traders in the early 17th century. (Note: As early as 1675, London contained over 3000 coffee-houses.) At the time the museum was built the coffee trade was dominated by the Dutch East Indies, but British colonists were planting huge coffee plantations in British East Africa (now Kenya).
5	Nicotiana tabacum, the tobacco plant. Tobacco from Nicotiana rustica (Aztec tobacco) had been introduced to England from the failed Roanoke Colony, the first British attempt at permanent settlement in North America, but the taste proved unpopular in European markets. In an effort to make the Colony of Virginia economically self-sufficient, settler John Rolfe began to plant seeds of the milder and better-tasting Nicotiana tabacum imported from Spanish colonies to the south. The climate and soil of Virginia proved ideal for the cultivation of tobacco, which soon became the principal export of the colony. The economic benefits of tobacco farming led to the colony prospering and to British expansion along the coast of North America, while the labour-intensive processes involved in tobacco production led to Britain entering the Atlantic slave trade.
6	Gossypium barbadense, extra-long staple cotton (also known as sea cotton). Cotton imported from the Mediterranean had been in limited use in Britain since the 16th century, but expansion in India led to muslin and calico—both made from Gossypium arboreum (tree cotton)—being imported to Britain in large quantities. Cotton-based fabrics were highly prized in Africa; as a consequence, Indian-made fabrics were traded by the British to African rulers in exchange for slaves, who in turn were shipped to North America to work in the tobacco industry. In the late 18th and early 19th centuries, as the Industrial Revolution began, raw cotton began to be shipped to Britain to be woven into fabrics in the newly built cotton mills. To supply these mills, Gossypium barbadense was planted across the southern states of the newly independent United States, largely staffed with cheap slave labour; as it had longer fibres than the tree cotton of India, it was more suitable for weaving in the new industrial mills. The plant was fundamental to both the British and the American economies; at the time the museum opened cotton accounted for more than half the value of exports from the US to Britain, and approximately one in 10 jobs in Britain were connected to the cotton industry. (Note: Alfred Waterhouse was a Quaker and an active abolitionist, and would have been well aware of the significance of Gossypium barbadense.)
7	Prunus amygdalus, the almond, was religiously significant in Christianity, being described in the Bible as among "the best fruits in the land".
8	Myroxylon pereira (now Myroxylon balsamum), was the source of Balsam of Peru. Balsam of Peru was a significant ingredient in perfumes and was also a commonly used food flavouring and traditional medication.
9	Butea frondosa, flame-of-the-forest or dhaak, an Indian plant whose sap was an important source of tannin.
10	Quercus tinctoria, the black oak (now called Quercus velutina), is a North American species that was endemic in most of the former British American colonies. It was valuable as a source of timber, and also as the source of quercitron. Before the invention of synthetic pigments in the 19th century quercitron was one of the most commonly used dyes in Europe, and was primarily imported through Glasgow.
11	Magnolia auriculata, the big-leaf magnolia (now called Magnolia fraseri), was native to the Blue Ridge Mountains in the Appalachians. Imported to Europe in large quantities, it became a hugely popular ornamental plant. This design was one of the two sample images that persuaded Acton Smee Ayrton to authorise the decoration of the ceiling.
12	Citrus bergamia, the bergamot orange. Bergamot is commonly used in perfume, and also gives Earl Grey tea its distinctive flavour and scent.
13	Aesculus hippocastanum, the horse chestnut, was native to the Balkans but had been cultivated throughout Europe. A popular ornamental plant, its hard seeds (known as conkers) were thought to be of medicinal benefit to horses.
14	Strychnos nux-vomica, the strychnine tree, is native to India. In 19th-century Britain strychnine, produced from the tree's fruit, was one of the most commonly used poisons, and of high commercial significance as a rodenticide.
15	Melanorrhœa usitata, Burmese lacquer (now known as Gluta usitata), was traditionally used as a source of varnish in Burma. As an Asian plant that would grow in the British climate, it was a popular ornamental plant in the 19th century.
16	Rhododendron formosum, a subspecies of Rhododendron maddenii, represents the many species of rhododendron. Rhododendrons were widely found in Nepal and the Himalayan foothills, a region with a similar climate to the British Isles, and as a consequence these plants flourished in the cool damp British climate. Rhododendrons and the closely related azaleas became hugely popular as ornamental plants in the 19th century, and a mainstay of 19th-century gardening. Several rhododendron and azalea cultivars have subsequently spread throughout Britain and other territories previously controlled or influenced by Britain.
17	Saccharum officinarum, the most common species of sugarcane, at the time the primary source of sugar. Although historically sugar was rarely used in Britain, it became hugely popular in the 18th century; in 1750 sugar constituted around one fifth of all European imports, and the overwhelming majority of these imports came from British and French slave plantations in the Caribbean. In the 19th century the popularity of sugar continued to rise; over the fifty years from 1800 to 1850 the per capita British consumption of sugar doubled.
18	Prunus domestica, the most common species of plum tree. Believed to be one of the first fruit trees to be domesticated, plums—particularly the Damson—were an important component of English cuisine.
19–24	Banksia speciosa, the showy banksia, was an Australian plant that was rarely grown in Britain, and was unlikely to be familiar to British audiences. It is probable that it was included as a tribute to Joseph Banks, naturalist on HMS Endeavour, after whom the genus was named, and whose 1820 bequest of his collections formed much of the core of the British Museum's botanical displays. Although named for Banks, Banksia speciosa was not one of the species collected by him on the Endeavour voyage, but was first described by Robert Brown.
25–30	Amygdalus persica, the peach tree. Although peaches do not grow well in Britain, they were nonetheless a popular fruit at the time. At the time the museum was built, peach trees were grown extensively in Britain in hothouses and against south-facing walls which were warmed by the sun, and peaches were considered a luxury item.
31–36	Theobroma cacao, the cacao tree, did not grow in Britain, but chocolate was highly popular in Britain at the time. It is possible that it was included as a tribute to Hans Sloane.
37–42	Quercus robur, the English oak, was considered a national symbol of England. Oaks were long-lived, hardy and strong, all qualities the English associated with themselves; they were also a key element in English culture, having been used as a building material in much of England's most celebrated architecture, and as the traditional English building material for warships.
43–48	Vitis vinefera, the grape vine. Although not native to Britain, visitors would have been familiar with grapes from the manufacture of wine, at the time considered a luxury.
49–54	Citrus aurantium, the Seville orange, did not generally grow in Britain, but was a staple of British culture as a key ingredient in marmalade and perfume.
55	Archaic panel depicting a stylised Butea frondosa (dhaak or flame-of-the-forest)
56	Archaic panel depicting a stylised Arisaema (cobra lily)
57	Archaic panel depicting a stylised Dillenia
58	Archaic panel depicting a stylised Piper (pepper), possibly Piper ribesioides
59	Archaic panel depicting a stylised Curcuma
60	Archaic panel depicting a stylised orchid
61	Archaic panel depicting a stylised Aloe
62	Archaic panel depicting a stylised orchid
63	Archaic panel depicting a stylised orange tree
64	Archaic panel depicting a stylised orchid
65	Archaic panel depicting a stylised Ottelia
66	Archaic panel depicting a stylised Blighia sapida (ackee)
67	Archaic panel depicting a stylised dahlia
68	Archaic panel depicting a stylised Quassia amara (Surinam quassia-wood)
69	Archaic panel depicting a stylised rose
70	Archaic panel depicting a stylised Phytelephas (ivory palm)
71	Archaic panel depicting a stylised Arbutus unedo (strawberry tree)
72	Archaic panel depicting an unidentifiable stylised plant
73	Archaic panel depicting a stylised Aesculus hippocastanum (horse chestnut)
74	Archaic panel depicting a stylised Markhamia stipulata
75	Archaic panel depicting a stylised Bletilla (urn orchid)
76	Archaic panel depicting a stylised Papaver somniferum (opium poppy)
77	Archaic panel depicting a stylised Matonia
78	Archaic panel depicting a stylised Momordica charantia (bitter melon or bitter apple)
79	Archaic panel depicting a stylised Psidium guajava (common guava)
80	Archaic panel depicting a stylised Helianthus annuus (common sunflower)
81	Archaic panel depicting a stylised Punica granatum (pomegranate)
82	Archaic panel depicting a stylised orchid
83	Archaic panel depicting a stylised Pothos
84	Archaic panel depicting a stylised Gladiolus
85	Archaic panel depicting a stylised hellebore
86	Archaic panel depicting a stylised Tradescantia
87	Archaic panel depicting an unidentifiable stylised plant
88	Archaic panel depicting a stylised Inula helenium (elecampane)
89	Archaic panel depicting a stylised Marantaceae (arrowroot)
90	Archaic panel depicting a stylised Vanilla planifolia (vanilla orchid)
91	Archaic panel depicting a stylised Asclepiadoideae (milkweed)
92	Archaic panel depicting a stylised Aristolochiaceae (birthwort)
93	Archaic panel depicting a stylised Passiflora (passion flower)
94	Archaic panel depicting a stylised Digitalis purpurea (common foxglove)
95	Archaic panel depicting a stylised Viburnum
96	Archaic panel depicting a stylised iris
97	Archaic panel depicting a stylised Rhododendron arboreum (tree rhododendron)
98	Archaic panel depicting a stylised Alcea rosea (common hollyhock)
99	Archaic panel depicting a stylised Ananas comosus (pineapple)
100	Archaic panel depicting a stylised lily
101	Archaic panel depicting a stylised Hedychium (ginger lily)
102	Archaic panel depicting a stylised Gossypium (cotton)
103	Archaic panel depicting a stylised Bertholletia excelsa (Brazil nut)
104	Archaic panel depicting a stylised Magnolia fraseri (big-leaf magnolia)
105	Archaic panel depicting a stylised Zantedeschia aethiopica (arum lily)
106	Archaic panel depicting an unidentifiable stylised Asteraceae (daisy), thought to be Arctotis or Chrysanthemum
107	Archaic panel depicting a stylised Lagerstroemia speciosa (crepe-myrtle)
108	Archaic panel depicting a stylised Passiflora caerulea (common passion flower)
109	Camellia thea, the tea plant (now known as Camellia sinensis), is native to China, and tea made from its leaves has been drunk in China for millennia. Since the early 17th century limited quantities of tea were imported into Europe from China, but the drink remained expensive and was initially little known in Britain. From the early 18th century onwards tea became popular and the British-owned East India Company began to import tea in large quantities from China. Chinese insistence on being paid in silver for tea, and for other exports such as porcelain, silk and spices, led to trade deficits and to shortages of silver in Britain. In 1773, in an effort to assist the East India Company and to reduce smuggling into its American colonies, Great Britain enacted the Tea Act, allowing the Company to ship tea duty-free to British North America, provoking the Boston Tea Party and subsequently the American War of Independence and the formation of the United States. China remained the sole source of tea, but in 1826 the plant was found growing wild in the East India Company's newly conquered territory of Assam. In 1848 the East India Company sent botanist Robert Fortune, disguised as a Chinese merchant, to visit China's tea-growing areas and steal seedlings of the highest quality tea plants; (Note: As a consequence of the trade deficit in silver, the East India Company began to pay for these goods with opium grown in its Indian territories, in violation of Chinese law. Chinese attempts to restrict the drug trade led to the First Opium War in which China was heavily defeated by the private army of the East India Company and the Royal Navy. The establishment of European-controlled treaty ports in the wake of China's defeat made it significantly easier for European merchants to visit China and for Europeans to smuggle items out of China.) these were shipped to India in Wardian cases and planted in Assam and other Company-controlled areas of the Himalayan foothills with a similar climate. These high quality tea plants flourished in these territories, and tea became one of the most important exports of British India.
110	Aloe succotrina, Fynbos aloe, is endemic to the Cape Province of South Africa. Since the days of the Roman Empire medicines derived from Aloe perryi had been imported from Socotra off the coast of north-east Africa, and when European botanists first reached the Cape they assumed the native aloes to be the same plant as that grown in Socotra and named it accordingly. (Note: Medicines derived from Aloe perryi were invariably exported to Europe in processed form. Consequently the botanists who assumed the aloes of mainland Africa to be identical to the aloes of Socotra had never seen a complete specimen of Aloe perryi and were unaware that it was a different species.) At the time the museum was built, aloe-based medicines were in common use.
111	Citrus medica, the citron. The first citrus fruit to be cultivated, since antiquity citrons had been an important ingredient in many medications.
112	Punica granatum, the pomegranate, did not grow in the British climate and was rarely used in British cuisine. It is likely that it was included owing to its religious significance. Along with Magnolia auriculata, this was one of the two sample images that persuaded Ayrton to authorise the painted ceiling.
113	Quassia amara, Surinam quassia-wood, grew widely in the then-British territory of British Guiana. A natural insecticide, it was valuable to 19th-century medicine as a treatment against parasites and as a larvicide to prevent mosquitoes from breeding.
114	Akesia africana, the ackee, is mislabelled on the ceiling; its scientific name was, and remains, Blighia sapida. (The scientific name Blighia sapida had been given to the ackee by staff at the British Museum, so the museum's staff would certainly have been aware of the correct name. Knapp & Press (2005) speculate that as the plant had been named by Charles Konig, a mineralogist rather than a botanist, the museum's botanists may have been unhappy accepting the name.) Ackee originated in West Africa, but was rarely cultivated there either by native inhabitants or by European settlers. It was introduced to Jamaica in the 18th century as a cheap and nutritious food for the region's slaves; it became widely popular there, and is now considered a symbol of Jamaica.
115	Diospyros embryopteris, the guab tree or Malabar ebony, a traditional source of black dye.
116	Zea mays, sweetcorn or maize, was the staple food of much of the Americas before European colonisation. Able to grow in a wide variety of climates, by the time the museum was built it was cultivated worldwide.
117	Cassia fistula, the golden shower tree, is an Indian plant. A strong laxative, in the 19th century it formed the basis of many European and traditional Indian medicines.
118	Calotropis procera, the apple of Sodom, was an inedible plant native to Palestine, and of little commercial use. It is likely that Waterhouse and the devoutly religious Owen included this plant owing to its religious significance.
119	Pyrus cydonia, the quince (now known as Cydonia oblonga), was a commonly eaten food in 19th-century Europe, and was also often grown as an ornamental plant. Knapp & Press (2005) conjecture that the quince was included to allow visitors to compare a familiar plant with those more exotic species also depicted on the ceiling.
120	Garcinia indica, the kokum, a commonly used element in Indian cuisine.
121	Myristica fragrans is the source of nutmeg, for centuries one of the world's most valuable commodities. Indigenous to the Maluku Islands (the Moluccas), it had historically been imported to Europe via land across Asia to the Ottoman Empire and onwards to Venice, and consequently was extremely scarce and expensive; it was the search for new routes to nutmeg markets that prompted the voyages of Vasco da Gama to India, of Christopher Columbus to the Americas, and of John Franklin to the Northwest Passage. The Maluku Islands were controlled by the Dutch, (Note: Although the Maluku Islands were controlled by the Dutch, the tiny island of Run had been controlled by the English and was England's sole source of nutmeg. In the 1667 Treaty of Breda England ceded Run to the Dutch in exchange for Manhattan, giving the Netherlands a monopoly on the world's nutmeg trade.) but in 1810 during the Napoleonic Wars British troops briefly captured the Banda Islands, seizing nutmeg trees which they subsequently planted in Ceylon.
122	Dillenia ornata, now known as Dillenia aurea, is a flowering shrub native to present-day India, Myanmar and Thailand. First described in Nathaniel Wallich's Plantae Asiaticae Rariores, whose botanical illustrations inspired many of the ceiling's archaic panels, its bright yellow flowers and ability to grow in the British climate made it a popular ornamental plant in the 19th century.
123	Ilex aquifolium, English holly, is one of the very few evergreen plants native to the British Isles. A common motif in British folklore and in Christian and pre-Christian symbolism, it would have been immediately familiar to the museum's visitors; Knapp & Press (2005) speculate that Waterhouse intentionally included this highly recognisable plant to encourage viewers to examine the less-familiar species also pictured.
124	Ricinus communis, the castor bean, was the source of castor oil, one of Victorian Britain's most commonly used medications. Castor oil was also a valuable lubricant in this period. Although native to Africa, it had spread throughout tropical regions, and at the time was thought to originate in India.
125	Pyrus communis, the European pear tree, was one of the most important native fruit trees in Britain. Its distinctive fruit would have been immediately recognisable to 19th-century viewers, serving to attract viewers to examine the ceiling more closely.
126	Cerasus communis, the sour cherry (now known as Prunus cerasus), was introduced to Britain by the Roman Empire and flourished in the climate. Frequently used in English cookery, particularly cherry pie, its distinctive red fruit would have been easily recognised by 19th-century visitors; Knapp & Press (2005) conjecture that as with the quince, it was included to allow viewers to compare this relatively familiar plant to the less recognisable species also illustrated.
127–132	Eucalyptus globulus, the Tasmanian blue gum tree. Although not native to Britain, in this period it was grown widely in Spain for the production of eucalyptus oil. Knapp & Press (2005) contend that this tree, with which British visitors were unlikely to have been familiar, was intentionally included among more familiar plants as a device to attract the attention of viewers.
133–138	Pinus sylvestris, the Scots pine, Great Britain's only native species of pine. As much of England had been cleared of woodland by this time, the remnants of the pine Caledonian Forest formed some of the most significant woodland in Britain, and the Scots pine was a national symbol of Scotland.
139–144	Citrus limonum, the lemon tree. As with the orange, lemons rarely grew in Britain, but were also popular in British cuisine.
145–150	Ficus carica, the fig tree, was largely unknown in Britain. As with the olive, figs and fig-leaves would have been familiar to 19th-century British visitors from the Biblical narrative; 19th-century visitors would likely have recognised the fig tree from its leaves rather than its fruit, owing to the use of fig-leaves in most depictions of Adam and Eve.
151–156	Olea europaea, the olive tree, was at the time almost unknown in Britain; they did not grow in the British climate, and both olives and olive oil were rarely used in British cookery. However, they would have been familiar to the museum's visitors, as olives were frequently mentioned in the Bible, and olive oil was often used as holy oil by the Anglican Church.
157–162	Pyrus malus, the apple tree, had for centuries been a staple fruit of the British diet. As a cultivated fruit developed by agricultural selection, the apple also symbolised human dominance over nature. At the time the ceilings were painted, botanists wrongly believed the apple tree to be descended from Malus sylvestris, the crab apple, and consequently native to Britain.

=== North Hall panels ===
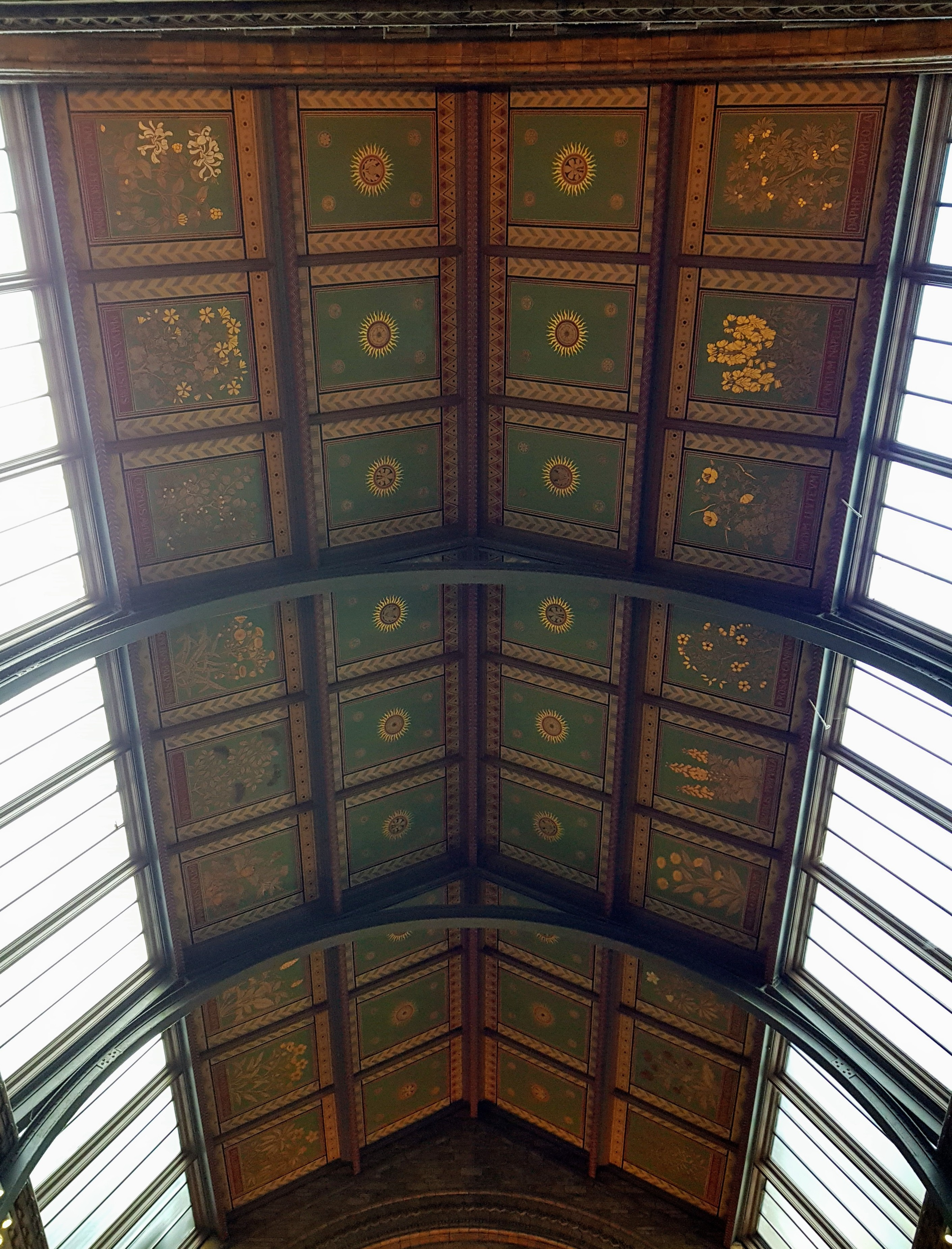
Ceiling of the North Hall

There are two rows of nine panels apiece on each side of the apex. The central (highest) rows on each side consist of plain green panels, each containing a heraldic rose, thistle or shamrock in representation of England, Scotland and Ireland, the three nations then constituting the United Kingdom. The nine lower panels on each side each illustrate a different plant found in Britain or Ireland.

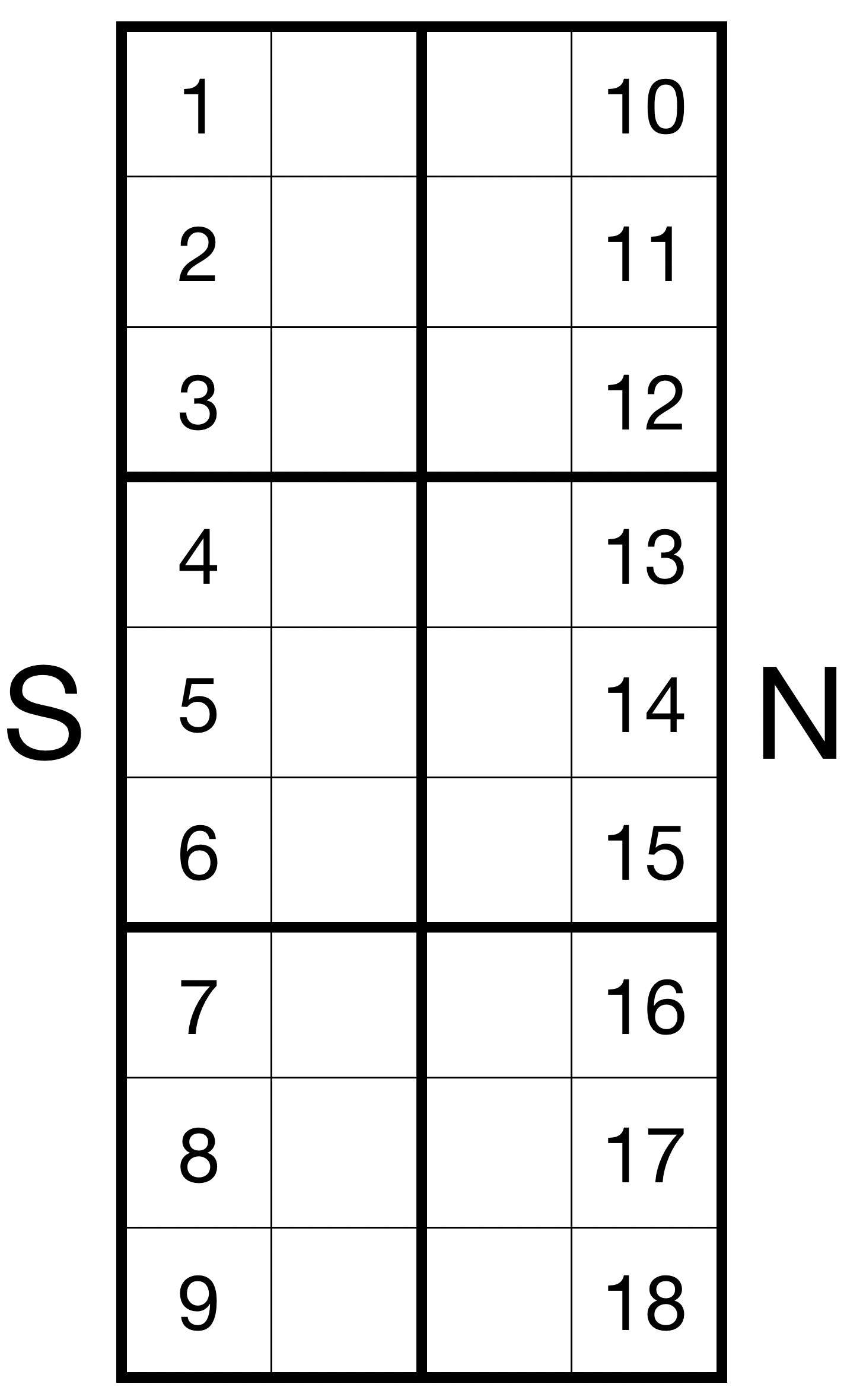

1	Lonicera periclymenum, woodbine or common honeysuckle, is highly valued as an ornamental plant, and has one of the sweetest floral scents of any native British plant.
2	Malva sylvestris, common mallow, is an archaeophyte (a species introduced to Britain before 1500). It grows on rough ground, particularly along roads, railways and the edges of fields.
3	Corylus avellana, common hazel, is one of the most widely grown varieties used for commercial hazelnut production.
4	Sonchus palustris, marsh sowthistle. Once a common species in Britain, its range was drastically reduced following the draining of the Fens.
5	Sambucus nigra, elder, was a common ornamental plant. At the time the museum was built it was also in common use as a herbal remedy.
6	Datura stramonium, jimsonweed or thornapple, is the only neophyte species (a species introduced after 1500 that now grows wild) represented on the North Hall ceiling. A commonly found weed, jimsonweed contains high levels of hyoscine (scopolamine), and at the time the museum was built was used as a herbal remedy for asthma and motion sickness. Jimsonweed was also well known as a powerful hallucinogen; its name originates from an incident in 1676 in which troops stationed in Jamestown during Bacon's Rebellion accidentally ate the plant and "turn'd natural Fools" for eleven days.
7	Polygonum bistorta, common bistort (also known as Bistorta officinalis and Persicaria bistorta), had been a common plant in the British Isles but its range was drastically reduced by cultivation. It became popular as an ornamental plant, and spread from gardens to once more become a common species throughout the British Isles.
8	Ranunculus lingua, greater spearwort, is a close relative of the better-known buttercup. It grows in the wild throughout the British Isles and Europe.
9	Helleborus niger, Christmas rose, is a shrub native to the Alps. Christmas rose was a popular ornamental plant but did not grow in the wild in the British Isles; Knapp & Press (2005) conjecture that Waterhouse included it to make the point that cultivated ornamental gardens also represented an important botanical habitat.
10	Epilobium Angustifolium, rosebay willowherb (also known as Chamaenerion angustifolium) was at the time the museum was built a relatively uncommon plant, found primarily in rocky uplands. As a species able to grow in rocky areas and to propagate quickly via rhizomes into areas cleared of other species by burning, during the Second World War it spread rapidly in urban areas destroyed by bombing, gaining rosebay willowherb the nickname of "fireweed" by which it remains frequently known.
11	Onopordum acanthium, Scotch thistle, is a national emblem of Scotland. At the time the museum was built it was believed to have originated in East Anglia, but is now thought to be an introduced species.
12	Helleborus viridis, green hellebore, is native to Wales and the south and west of England. A popular ornamental plant, it has spread from gardens and grows wild throughout Britain.
13	Inula helenium, elecampane, was a significant source of inulin, and as such had been valued as a medicinal plant since the Roman era. Although an introduced species, it has grown wild throughout Britain for centuries.
14	Digitalis purpurea, common foxglove, has been a medicinal plant for millennia. One of its active ingredients, digitoxin, was the most significant drug for cardiac conditions at the time the museum was built.
15	Rosa canina, dog rose, was a common ornamental species. It would also have been familiar to the museum's visitors as a plant then in common medicinal use.
16	Glaucium luteum, yellow horned poppy (now known as Glaucium flavum). A source of glaucine, it is used as a cough suppressant.
17	Aconitum napellus, monk's hood or wolfsbane. Aconitum napellus napellus, the subspecies found in Britain, is one of the few plants endemic to Britain.
18	Daphne laureola, spurge laurel. As a plant toxic to mammals but not to birds, it was widely cultivated on country estates to provide ground cover for the rearing of pheasants for shooting.
