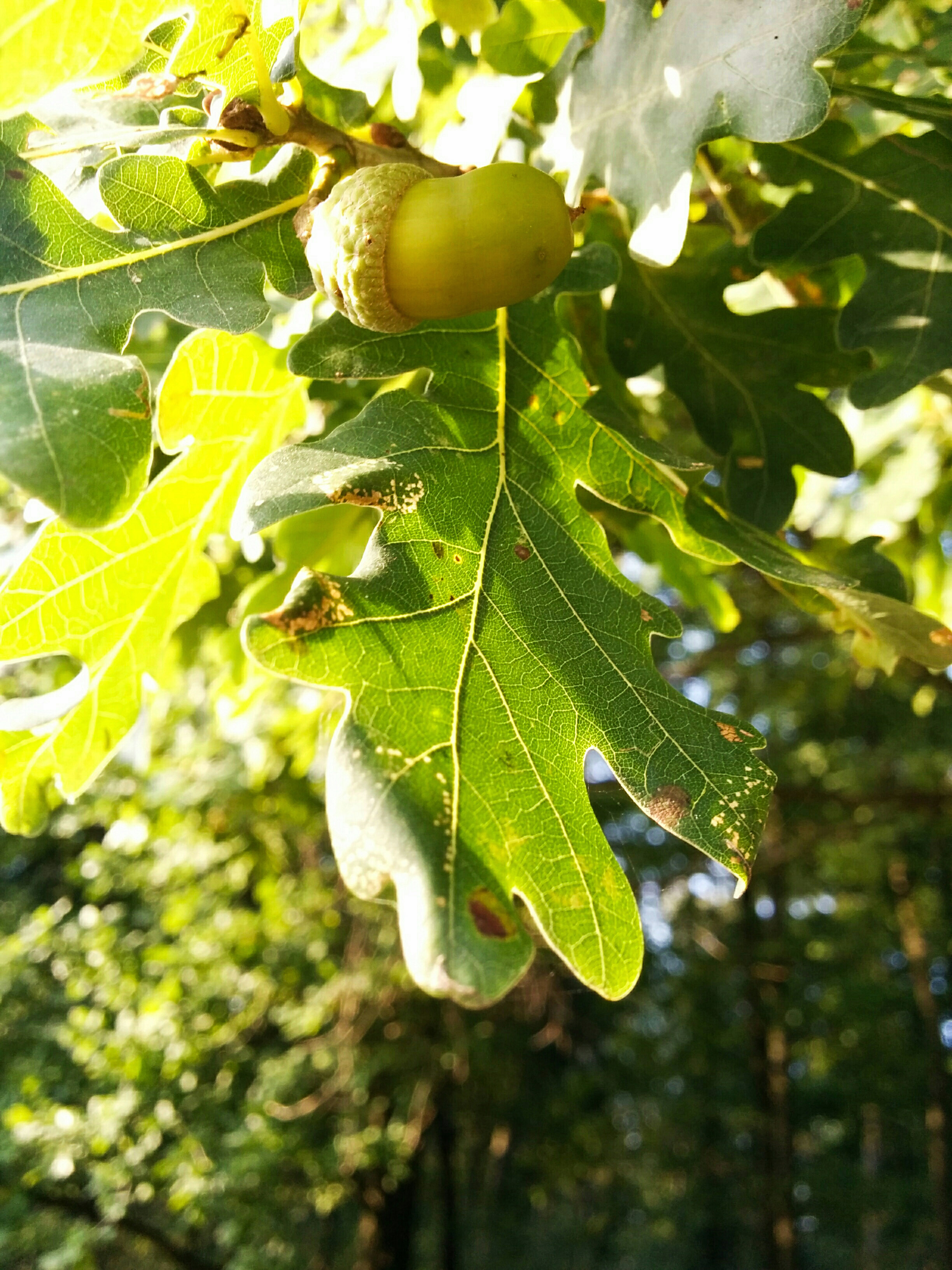
- Leaf cluster with acorn

Scientific classification
- Kingdom: Plantae
- Clade: Tracheophytes
- Clade: Angiosperms
- Clade: Eudicots
- Clade: Rosids
- Order: Fagales
- Family: Fagaceae
- Genus: Quercus
- Species: Q. × rosacea

Binomial name
- Quercus × rosacea Bechst.

Synonyms
- Quercus × brevipes Heuff.; Quercus × csatoi Borbás; Quercus × sessiloides H.Lév.; Quercus × allardii Hy; Quercus × bossebovii Hy; Quercus × castoi Borbás; Quercus × erioneura Borbás; Quercus × feketei Simonk.; Quercus × hybrida Bechst. [Nom. illeg.]; Quercus × intermedia Boenn. ex Rchb.; Quercus × roborigermanica Lasch; Quercus × secalliana C.Vicioso; Quercus × superlata Borbás

= Quercus × rosacea =

Hybrid species of oak

Quercus × rosacea, the hybrid oak, is a naturally occurring hybrid species of oak native to central and northern Europe. It is a hybrid between sessile oak Quercus petraea, and pedunculate oak Quercus robur, found where their ranges overlap. As a fertile hybrid, it is morphologically variable, but in general the traits are intermediate between those of the parents.

A thin section of a Q. × rosacea specimen was used by artist-in-residence Tania Kovats to create a monumental work called TREE for the ceiling of the Mezzanine of the Natural History Museum, London in celebration of the bicentennial of Charles Darwin's birth.
