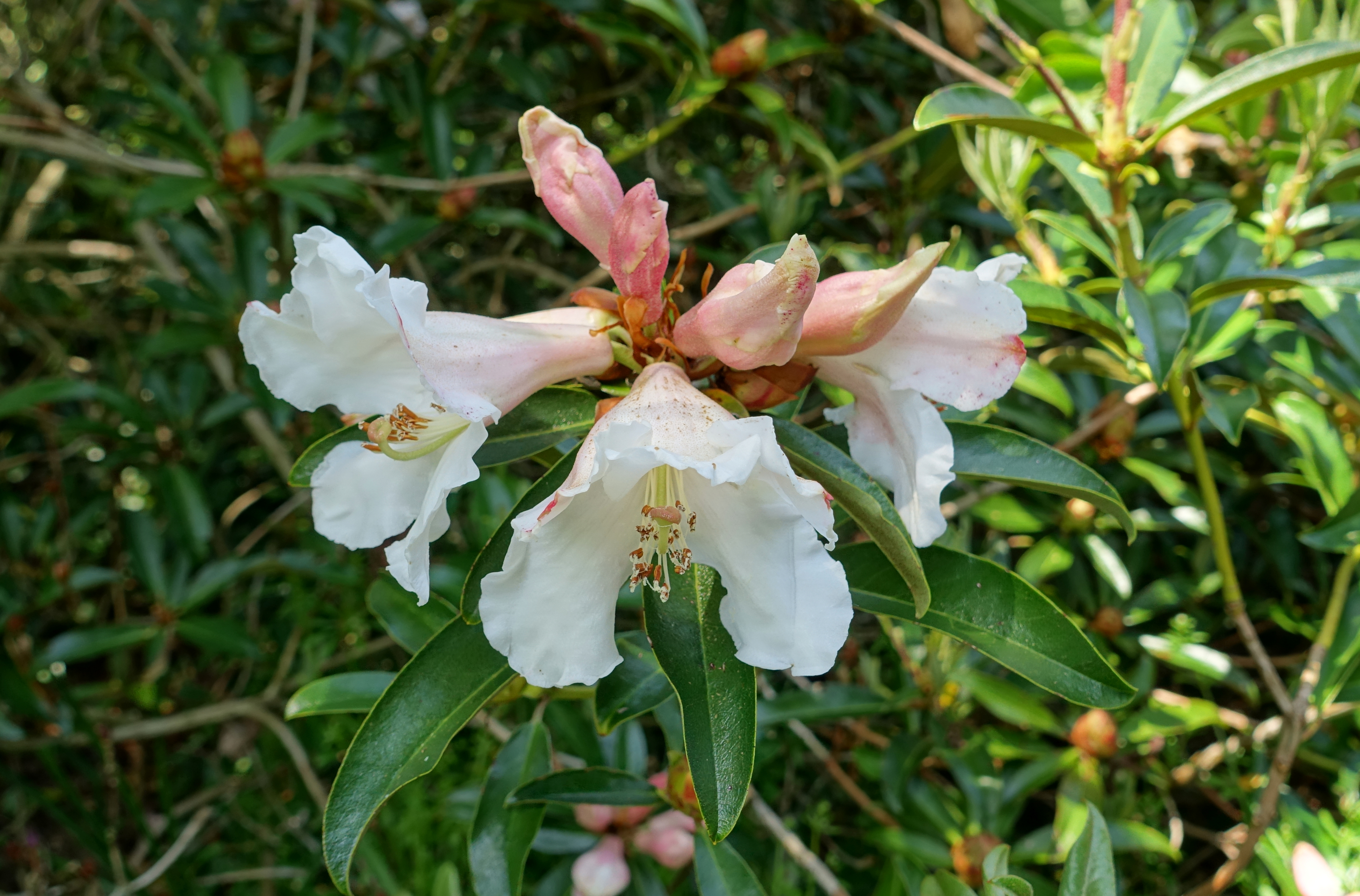

Scientific classification
- Kingdom: Plantae
- Clade: Tracheophytes
- Clade: Angiosperms
- Clade: Eudicots
- Clade: Asterids
- Order: Ericales
- Family: Ericaceae
- Genus: Rhododendron
- Species: R. maddenii

Binomial name
- Rhododendron maddenii Hook.f.

= Rhododendron maddenii =

Species of plant

Rhododendron maddenii (隐脉杜鹃) is a rhododendron species native to Bhutan, northern India, northeast Myanmar, Sikkim, Thailand, northern Vietnam, and southwestern China, where it grows at altitudes of 2,600–3,200 m (8,500–10,500 ft). It is an evergreen shrub or small tree growing to 3–6 m (9.8–19.7 ft) in height, with leathery leaves that are lanceolate, oblong-oblanceolate, or elliptic, 5–15 by 2–8 cm in size. The flowers are predominantly white, very fragrant, and unusually produced during May and June. However, it dislikes freezing temperatures (RHS H3), and is more likely to thrive in warm or coastal temperate climates such as Cornwall, UK.
