= Dippy (statue) =

Statue in Pittsburgh, Pennsylvania, United States

Coordinates: 40°26′36.8″N 79°57′05.4″W

Diplodocus carnegii
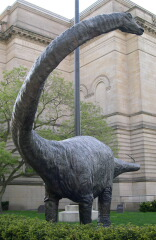
- Year: 1999
- Type: fiberglass
- Dimensions: 22 feet (6.7 m) high, 84 feet (26 m) long
- Location: Carnegie Museum of Natural History, Pittsburgh, Pennsylvania

Dippy is a public sculpture of Dippy, or Diplodocus carnegii, on the grounds of the Carnegie Institute and Library complex in the Oakland neighborhood of Pittsburgh, Pennsylvania.

The life-size fiberglass model depicts Dippy, or Diplodocus carnegii, considered the most famous single dinosaur skeleton in the world. The dark, grayish brown sculpture weighs 3,000 pounds, stands 22 feet, and measures 84 feet in length. Sited along Forbes Avenue near Schenley Plaza and the lawn of the University of Pittsburgh's Cathedral of Learning, Dippy stands adjacent to the entrances of the Carnegie Music Hall and the Carnegie Museum of Natural History.

== History ==
Dippy was created in 1999 by the Carnegie Museums in tribute to the 100th anniversary of an expedition—financed by Andrew Carnegie—which discovered Diplodocus fossils in the badlands of Wyoming. The study of the specimen was overseen by John Bell Hatcher.

The best specimen the team uncovered on July 4, 1899, was a nearly complete fossil skeleton of Diplodocus. Team member Arthur Coggeshall joked that the fossil should be called "Star-Spangled Dinosaur", because of its July 4 finding. Carnegie's friends, however, dubbed it "Dippy", which was first displayed to great acclaim in 1907. The name has stuck ever since.

King Edward VII, when he visited at Carnegie's Skibo Castle in Scotland, asked for a plaster cast to be displayed in London, and the cast was first displayed in 1905. Kaiser Wilhelm II and other European heads of state asked for copies. Even 100 years later copies of Dippy are displayed in the Natural History Museum in London, the Natural Science Museum in Madrid, the Senckenberg Museum in Frankfurt, Germany, and the Field Museum of Natural History in Chicago.

Dippy the sculpture was created during a nine-month process from the original fossil, which still stands indoors in the museum's Dinosaur Hall.

In addition to its service as a mascot for the museum, Dippy has been seen sporting the Terrible Towel of the Pittsburgh Steelers and the colors of University of Pittsburgh's athletic teams. Sometimes when it's cold out the staff dresses him up with a gigantic scarf.

The same year that the sculpture was created, the six-part nature documentary television miniseries Walking With Dinosaurs produced by the BBC Science Unit was released. Diplodocus features in the second episode, Time of Titans.

Dippy is a featured Pittsburgh landmark on Yinztagram.
