= Hope (whale) =

Blue whale skeleton located at the London Natural History Museum

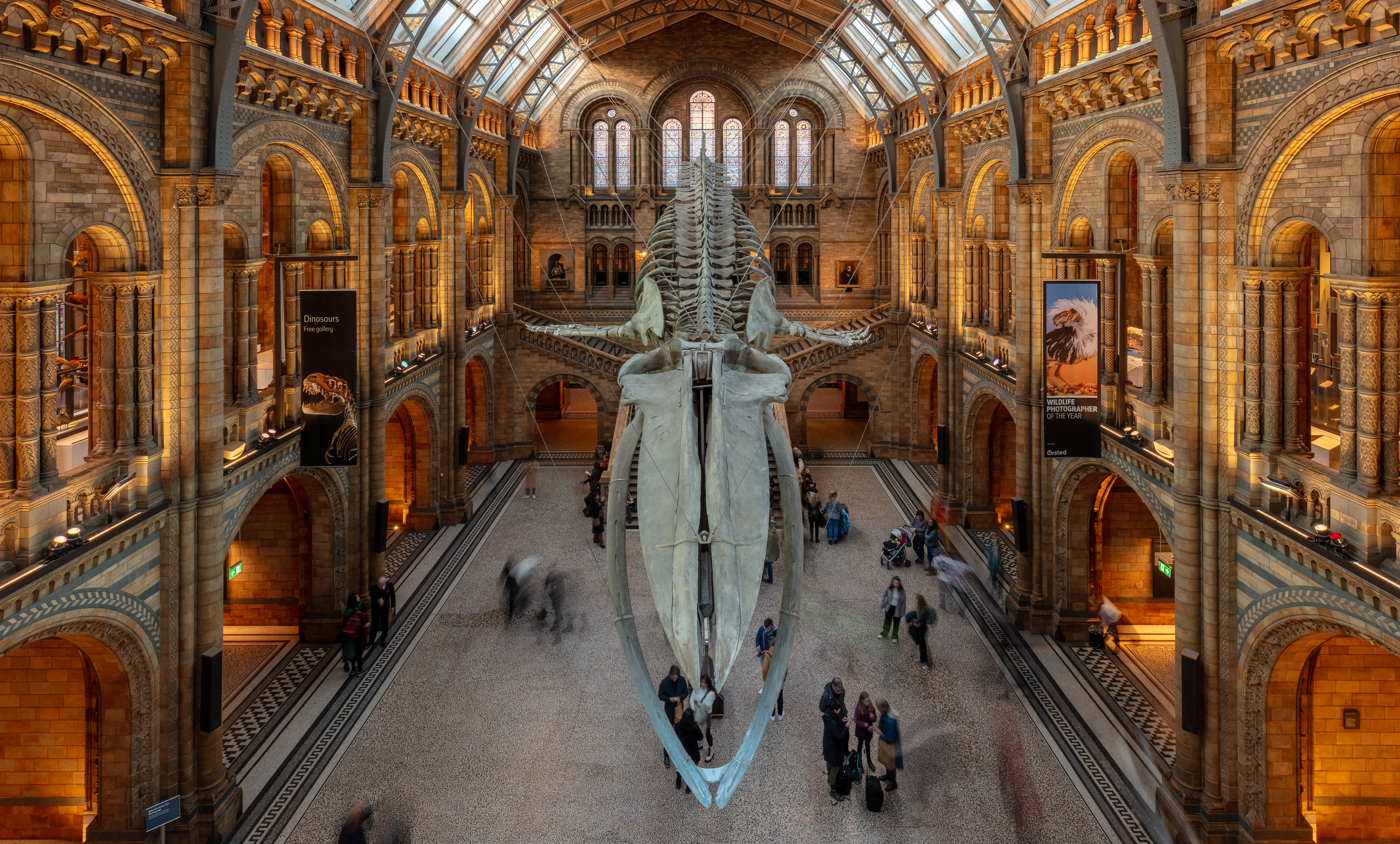
- Hope in the Hintze Hall at the Natural History Museum, London
- Species: Blue whale (Balaenoptera musculus)
- Sex: Female
- Born: c. 1871 or 1876–1881
- Died: 27 March 1891 (aged 10–15 or 20)
- Height: 25.2 m (82 ft 8 in)

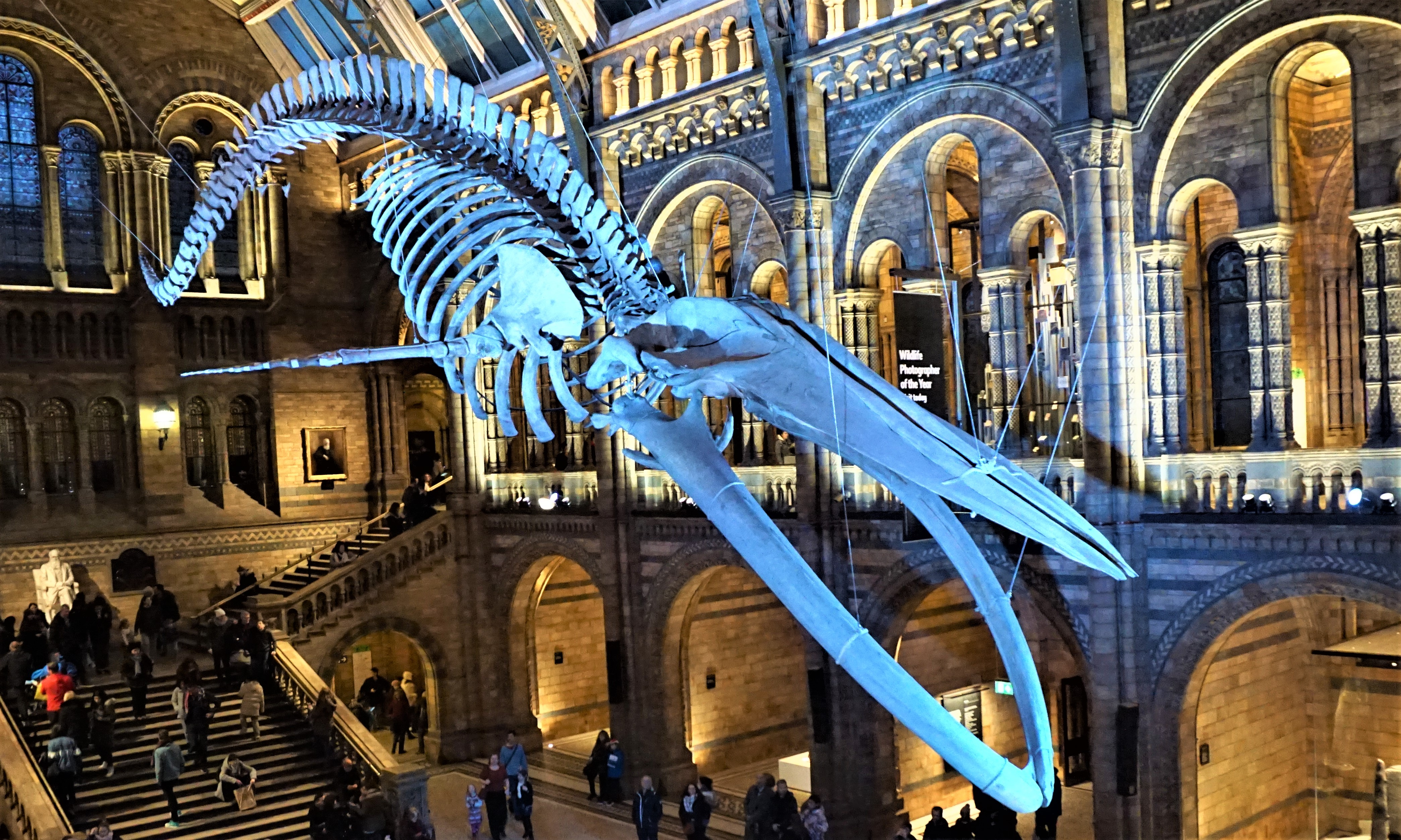
The whale is posed in a diving lunge

Hope is the skeleton of a juvenile female blue whale displayed in Hintze Hall, the main hall of the Natural History Museum, London. It measures 25.2 metres (83 ft) in length, consists of 221 bones, and weighs 4.5 tonnes.

Born around 1871 or at least 1876–1881, the whale lived for at least 10–15 years, with a maximum of 20, before becoming stranded on a sandbar near Wexford Harbour, Ireland, in March 1891 and being killed by a fisherman two days later. Its skeleton was sold to the Natural History Museum, where it was displayed in its Mammal Hall from 1934 before being moved to the museum's main Hintze Hall in 2017, replacing Dippy, a cast of a diplodocus skeleton.

== History ==
=== Life ===
Analysis of isotopes in the whale's baleen plates published in 2018 indicated that the whale lived in the tropical Atlantic for its first seven years of life, and then spending some years migrating north to feed on krill in the northern Atlantic each summer and then migrating back south each winter. Towards the end of its life, this whale probably spent about a year in the tropics with its calf, born in the winter of 1889–1890, and it was during a migration back north through the Irish Sea that the whale became stranded.

=== Death ===
This whale likely died when it was at least 10–15 years old, with the maximum estimated age being 20 years old. The juvenile female blue whale was found by fisherman Edward Wickham on 25 March 1891, stranded on a sandbar near Wexford Harbour on the southeast coast of Ireland. The whale struggled in the shallow waters for two days until it was killed by Wickham with an improvised harpoon. The Receiver of Wreck sold her carcass at auction for £111 to the local harbour master William Armstrong, from which Wickham and the other salvagers were paid £50 for their work. The whale flesh and blubber were removed. The death of the whale took place just prior to a global boom in commercial whaling.

=== Display in the Natural History Museum ===
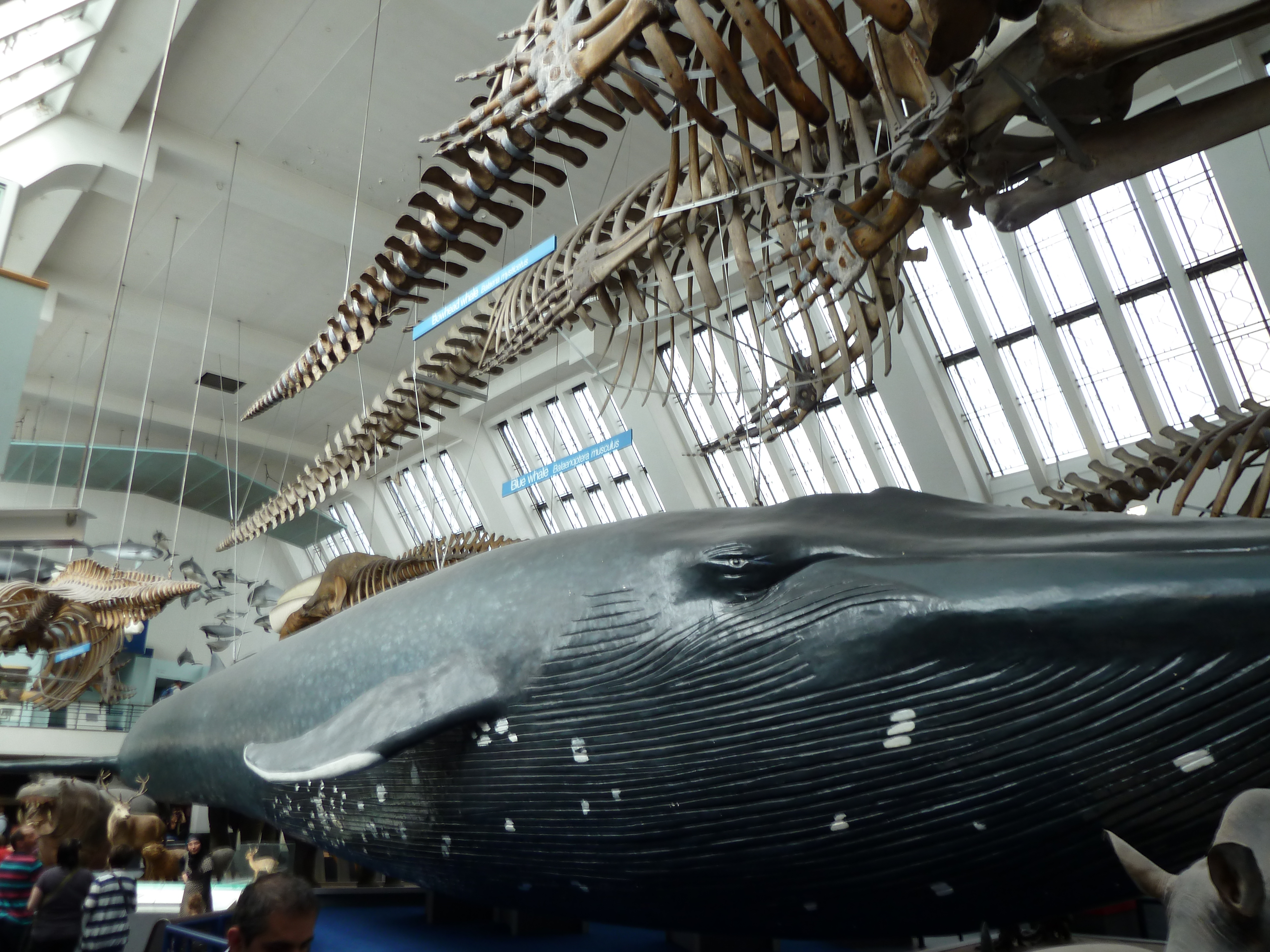
The skeleton (background) previously hanging above the blue whale model in the mammals gallery

The Natural History Museum in London bought the skeleton, along with its baleen plates, for £250. The skeleton was kept in storage until 1934, when it went on display in the museum's new Mammal Hall, suspended above a similarly sized plaster model of a blue whale. In this position, it was not in full view of museum visitors.

The whale began a move to the museum's central entrance hall, Hintze Hall, in November 2015. Conservation on Hope in the museum's stores began in April 2016 as part of this move. After 10 months in this pop-up lab, it was moved to an adapted aircraft hangar in a secret location near Bicester, where lidar scanning was used to create a 1.5-metre-long 3D printout of the whale, so its articulation could be planned. It was re-displayed there in 2017, suspended from the ceiling in a naturalistic diving lunge feeding posture, the only blue whale skeleton in the world to be hung in this position. Its body was positioned off-centre to fully capture this corkscrew motion, and its mandibles were positioned open, 4.2 metres (14 ft) off the floor compared to its highest point at 13.5 metres (44 ft). The hall reopened to the public on 14 July 2017. Newly named Hope by the museum as a "symbol of humanity's power to shape a sustainable future", it replaced the previous main exhibit, a diplodocus cast known as Dippy, which had been displayed in the main hall since 1979 and until January 2017. This replacement was part of a refresh of the museum's image, intended to make the museum more known for its living science than its fossils. An Horizon documentary film about the process, narrated by David Attenborough, was created by the BBC.

== See also ==
- List of individual cetaceans
