= Bone Wars (book) =

Book by Tom Rea

Bone Wars: The Excavation and Celebrity of Andrew Carnegie's Dinosaur
- Author: Tom Rea
- Language: English
- Subject: Bone Wars
- Genre: Non-fiction
- Publication date: 2001
- ISBN: 978-0822941736

Bone Wars: The Excavation and Celebrity of Andrew Carnegie's Dinosaur is a 2001 nonfiction book by Tom Rea detailing a partial history of the Bone Wars, specifically the late-Victorian scientific drama surrounding the diplodocus skeleton "Dippy".

== Synopsis ==
This skeleton was one of the most famous dinosaur skeletons ever discovered. Named Diplodocus carnegii for Andrew Carnegie, the Scottish-American industrialist, it is arguably the first complete dinosaur ever seen by millions of people. The fossil was discovered and eventually acquired by a team from the Carnegie Museum of Natural History during an expedition to the badlands of Wyoming. After the fossil was Uncovered on July 4, 1899, team member Arthur Coggeshall joked that it should be called "Star-Spangled Dinosaur" because of its July 4 "birthday". Andrew Carnegie's friends dubbed it "Dippy". The name has stuck ever since.

The paleontologist John Bell Hatcher (1861–1904) oversaw the study of the fossil and its preparation for display. His illustration of the skeleton hung on a wall at Carnegie's Skibo Castle in Scotland. When in 1902 the English King Edward VII (1841–1910) visited, he asked if Carnegie could obtain another dinosaur like Dippy for him to place in the British Museum. It was a rare find, of course, but Carnegie offered the king a plaster copy, which was installed May 12, 1905 in London. The original bones, however, were not prepared and erected at the Carnegie in Pittsburgh, Pennsylvania until 1907.

Kaiser Wilhelm II and other European royalty followed suit and asked for Diplodocus carnegii copies for their national museums. During the next 25 years replicas were installed in Berlin, Germany; Paris, France; Vienna, Austria; Bologna, Italy; St. Petersburg, Russia; La Plata, Argentina; Madrid, Spain; and Mexico City, Mexico, making Dippy the first dinosaur specimen to be duplicated so frequently and internationally for viewing by the masses.

For more than a century Dippy has remained the Carnegie Museum's most iconic specimen. In 1999, to pay tribute to the 100th anniversary of its discovery, the Carnegie created a life-size fiberglass sculpture of Diplodocus carnegii weighing 3,000 pounds, standing 22 feet, and measuring 84 feet in length. The sculpture is sited prominently on Schenley Plaza outside the museum, while the original fossil still stands indoors in Dinosaur Hall.

== Reception ==
The book received reviews from publications including Isis, Rocks & Minerals, Pittsburgh Post-Gazette, and Booklist.
