= Natural History Museum, London =

Museum in South Kensington, London

Natural History Museum

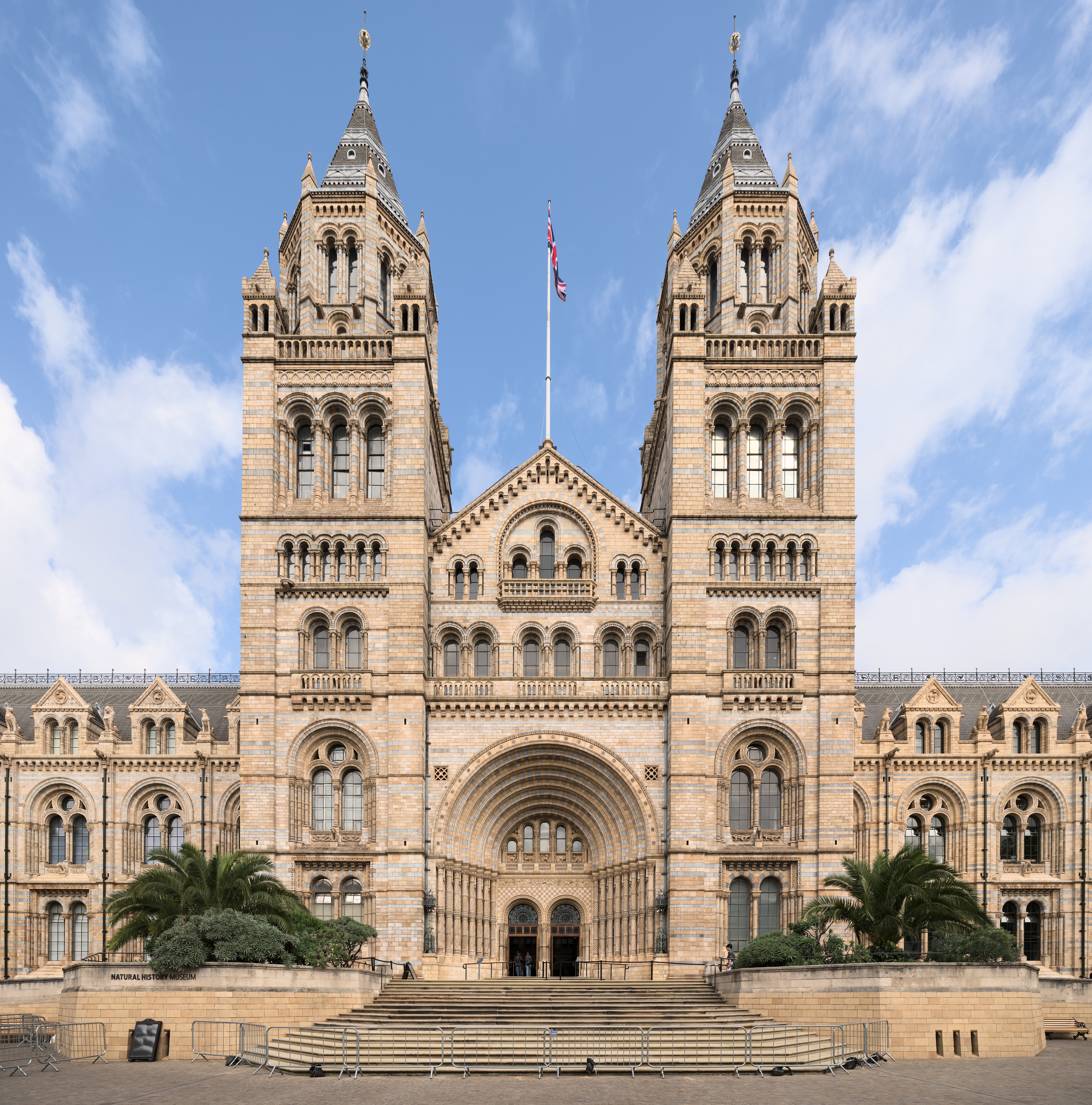
- Front façade of the museum in September 2025

- Location within Central London
- Established: 1881; 145 years ago
- Location: Kensington & Chelsea, London, SW7; England
- Coordinates: 51°29′46″N 00°10′35″W
- Type: Natural history museum
- Visitors: 7,116,929 in 2025
- Founder: Richard Owen
- Director: Doug Gurr
- Public transit access: South Kensington; Kensington Museums 360; Victoria & Albert Museum 14, 74, C1
- Website: www.nhm.ac.uk

The Natural History Museum in London, England, is a museum that exhibits a vast range of specimens from various segments of natural history. It is one of three major museums on Exhibition Road in South Kensington, the others being the Science Museum and the Victoria and Albert Museum. The Natural History Museum's main frontage, however, is on Cromwell Road.

The museum is home to life and earth science specimens comprising some 80 million items within five main collections: botany, entomology, mineralogy, palaeontology and zoology. The museum is a centre of research specialising in taxonomy, identification and conservation. Given the age of the institution, many of the collections have great historical as well as scientific value, such as specimens collected by Charles Darwin. The museum is particularly famous for its exhibition of dinosaur skeletons and ornate architecture—sometimes dubbed a cathedral of nature—both exemplified by the large Diplodocus cast that dominated the vaulted central hall before it was replaced in 2017 with the skeleton of a blue whale hanging from the ceiling. The Natural History Museum Library contains an extensive collection of books, journals, manuscripts, and artwork linked to the work and research of the scientific departments; access to the library is by appointment only. The museum is recognised as the pre-eminent centre of natural history and research of related fields in the world.

Although commonly referred to as the Natural History Museum, it was officially known as British Museum (Natural History) until 1992, despite legal separation from the British Museum itself in 1963. Originating from collections within the British Museum, the landmark Alfred Waterhouse building was built and opened by 1881 and later incorporated the Geological Museum. The Darwin Centre is a more recent addition, partly designed as a modern facility for storing the valuable collections.

Like other publicly funded national museums in the United Kingdom, the Natural History Museum does not charge an admission fee. The museum is an exempt charity and a non-departmental public body sponsored by the Department for Culture, Media and Sport. The Princess of Wales is a patron of the museum. There are approximately 850 staff at the museum. The two largest strategic groups are the Public Engagement Group and the Science Group.

== History ==
=== Early history ===
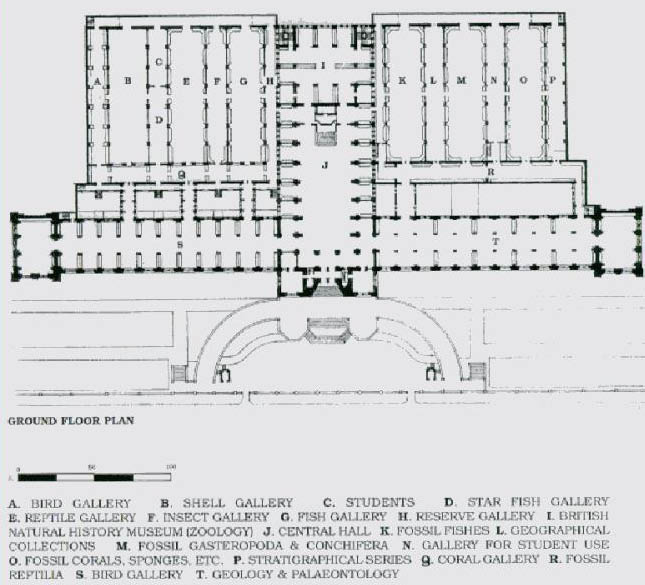
An 1881 plan showing the original arrangement of the museum (link to current floor plans)

The foundation of the collection was that of the Ulster doctor Sir Hans Sloane (1660–1753), who allowed his significant collections to be purchased by the British Government at a price well below their market value at the time. This purchase was funded by a lottery. Sloane's collection, which included dried plants, and animal and human skeletons, was initially housed in Montagu House, Bloomsbury, in 1756, which was the home of the British Museum.

Most of the Sloane collection had disappeared by the early decades of the nineteenth century. Dr George Shaw (Keeper of Natural History 1806–1813) sold many specimens to the Royal College of Surgeons and had periodic cremations of material in the grounds of the museum. His successors also applied to the trustees for permission to destroy decayed specimens. In 1833, the Annual Report states that, of the 5,500 insects listed in the Sloane catalogue, none remained. The inability of the natural history departments to conserve their specimens became notorious: the Treasury refused to entrust them with specimens collected at the government's expense. Appointments of staff were bedevilled by gentlemanly favouritism; in 1862, a nephew of the mistress of a Trustee was appointed Entomological Assistant despite not knowing the difference between a butterfly and a moth.

J. E. Gray (Keeper of Zoology 1840–1874) complained of the incidence of mental illness amongst staff: George Shaw threatened to put his foot on any shell not in the 12th edition of Linnaeus' Systema Naturae; another had removed all the labels and registration numbers from entomological cases arranged by a rival. The huge collection of the conchologist Hugh Cuming was acquired by the museum, and Gray's wife had carried the open trays across the courtyard in a gale: all the labels blew away. That collection is said never to have recovered.

The Principal Librarian at the time was Antonio Panizzi; his contempt for the natural history departments and for science in general was total. The general public was not encouraged to visit the museum's natural history exhibits. In 1835 to a Select Committee of Parliament, Sir Henry Ellis said this policy was fully approved by the Principal Librarian and his senior colleagues.

Many of these faults were corrected by the palaeontologist Richard Owen, appointed Superintendent of the natural history departments of the British Museum in 1856. His changes led Bill Bryson to write that "by making the Natural History Museum an institution for everyone, Owen transformed our expectations of what museums are for".

=== Planning and architecture of new building ===
Owen saw that the natural history departments needed more space, and that implied a separate building, as the British Museum site was limited. Land in South Kensington was purchased, and in 1864 a competition was held to design the new museum. Only thirty-three submissions were made, many of which contained elements of the Renaissance style. The winning entry was submitted by the civil engineer Captain Francis Fowke, who died shortly afterwards in December 1865. To give the project to the second-place winner would have been viewed as disrespectful to Fowke's memory, and instead the decision was made to expand on his original plans. The scheme was taken over by Alfred Waterhouse, who was hired in February 1866, and who substantially revised the agreed plans, and designed the façades in his own idiosyncratic Romanesque style, which was inspired by his frequent visits to the Continent. The original plans included wings on either side of the main building, but these plans were soon abandoned for budgetary reasons. Initially, Waterhouse's approximate cost was £495,000, but after further discussion was revised to £330,000. The space these would have occupied are now taken by the Earth Galleries and Darwin Centre. Waterhouse spent time with those in charge of each department of the museum to learn more about their needs, which helped him clarify his plans before construction began.

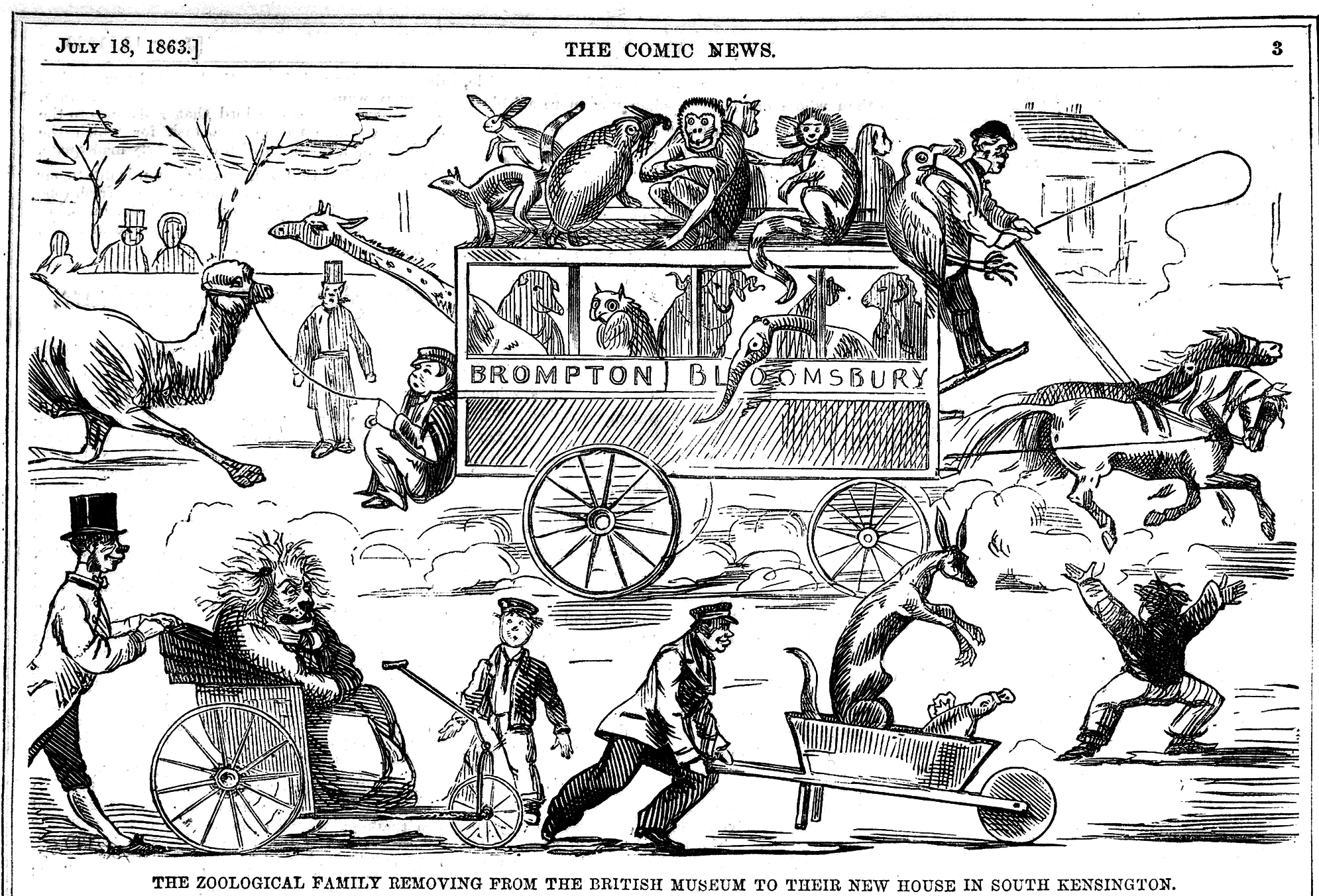
The Comic News reporting on the movement to South Kensington in 1863

Work began in 1873 and was completed in 1880. The new museum opened on 18 April 1881, although the move from the old museum was not fully completed until 1883. The museum received both positive and negative reviews by the media upon its opening, but most viewed the museum as a positive contribution to society. In addition to routine maintenance, the building has been altered over the years, especially after it sustained damage in World War II.

Both the interiors and exteriors of the Waterhouse building make extensive use of architectural terracotta tiles to resist the sooty atmosphere of Victorian London, manufactured by the Tamworth-based company of Gibbs and Canning. The tiles and bricks feature many relief sculptures of flora and fauna, with living and extinct species featured within the west and east wings respectively. This explicit separation was at the request of Owen, and has been seen as a statement of his contemporary rebuttal of Darwin's attempt to link present species with the past through the theory of natural selection. Though Waterhouse slipped in a few anomalies, such as bats amongst the extinct animals and a fossil ammonite with the living species. The sculptures were produced from clay models by a French sculptor based in London, M Dujardin, working to drawings prepared by the architect.

The central axis of the museum is aligned with the tower of Imperial College London (formerly the Imperial Institute) and the Royal Albert Hall and Albert Memorial further north. These all form part of the complex known colloquially as Albertopolis.

=== Separation from the British Museum ===
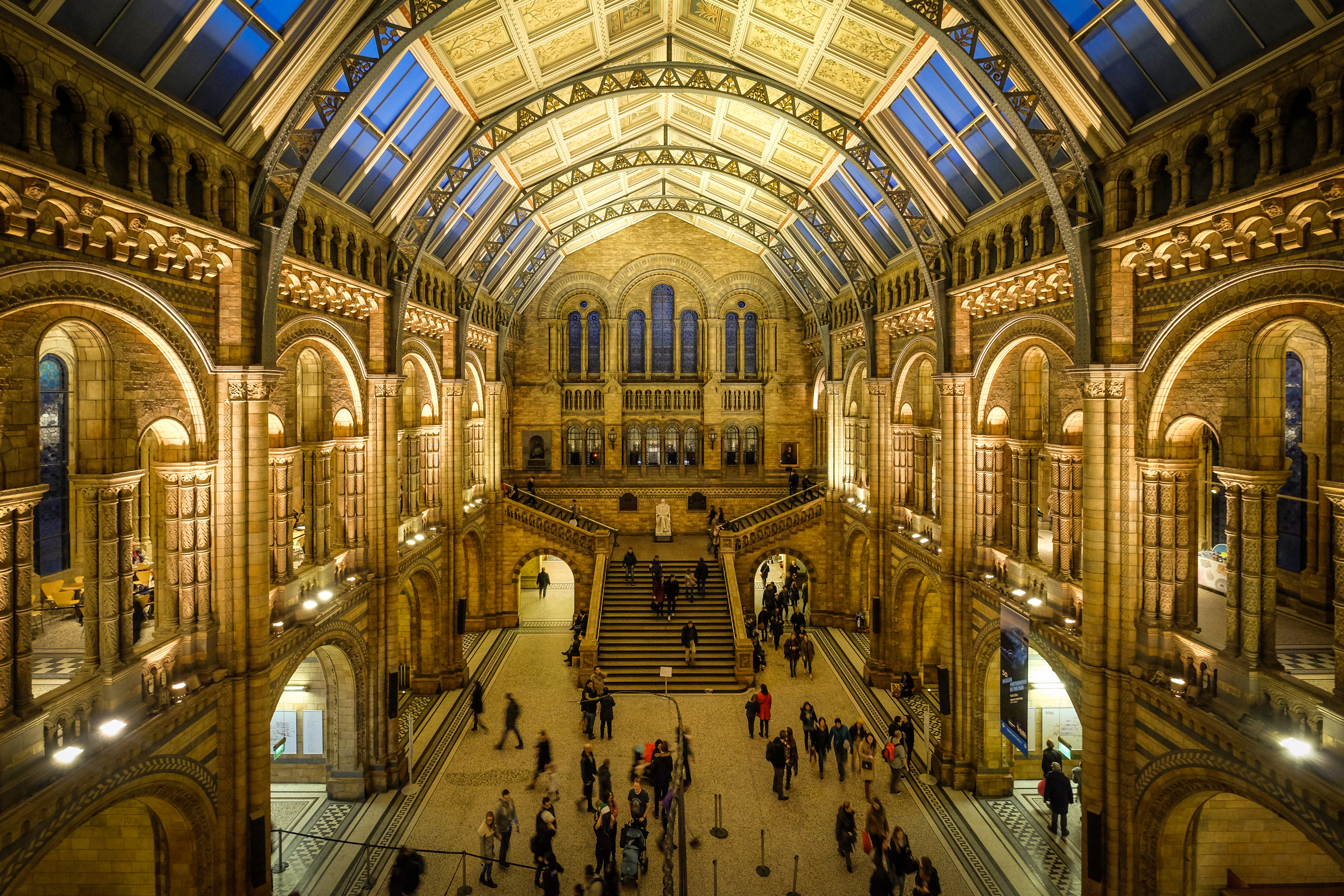
The central hall of the museum

Even after the opening, the Natural History Museum legally remained a department of the British Museum with the formal name British Museum (Natural History), usually abbreviated in the scientific literature as B.M.(N.H.). A petition to the Chancellor of the Exchequer was made in 1866, signed by the heads of the Royal, Linnean and Zoological societies as well as naturalists including Darwin, Wallace and Huxley, asking that the museum gain independence from the board of the British Museum, and heated discussions on the matter continued for nearly one hundred years. Finally, with the passing of the British Museum Act 1963, the British Museum (Natural History) became an independent museum with its own board of trustees, although – despite a proposed amendment to the act in the House of Lords – the former name was retained. In 1989 the museum publicly re-branded itself as the Natural History Museum and stopped using the title British Museum (Natural History) on its advertising and its books for general readers. Only with the Museums and Galleries Act 1992 did the museum's formal title finally change to the Natural History Museum.

=== Geological Museum ===
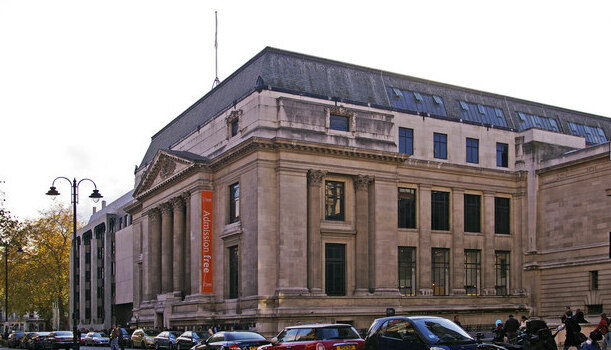
The Geological Museum building

In 1985, the museum merged with the adjacent Geological Museum of the British Geological Survey, which had long competed for the limited space available in the area. The Geological Museum became world-famous for exhibitions including an active volcano model and an earthquake machine (designed by James Gardner), and housed the world's first computer-enhanced exhibition (Treasures of the Earth). The museum's galleries were completely rebuilt and relaunched in 1996 as The Earth Galleries, with the other exhibitions in the Waterhouse building retitled The Life Galleries. The Natural History Museum's own mineralogy displays remain largely unchanged as an example of the 19th-century display techniques of the Waterhouse building.

The central atrium design by Neal Potter overcame visitors' reluctance to visit the upper galleries by "pulling" them through a model of the Earth made up of random plates on an escalator. The new design covered the walls in recycled slate and sandblasted the major stars and planets onto the wall. The museum's 'star' geological exhibits are displayed within the walls. Six iconic figures were the backdrop to discussing how previous generations have viewed Earth. These were later removed to make place for a Stegosaurus skeleton that was put on display in late 2015.

=== The Darwin Centre ===
The Darwin Centre (named after Charles Darwin) was designed as a new home for the museum's collection of tens of millions of preserved specimens, as well as new work spaces for the museum's scientific staff and new educational visitor experiences. Built in two distinct phases, with two new buildings adjacent to the main Waterhouse building, it is the most significant new development project in the museum's history.

Phase one of the Darwin Centre opened to the public in 2002, and it houses the zoological department's 'spirit collections'—organisms preserved in alcohol. Phase Two was unveiled in September 2008 and opened to the general public in September 2009. It was designed by the Danish architecture practice C. F. Møller Architects in the shape of a giant, eight-story cocoon and houses the entomology and botanical collections—the 'dry collections'. It is possible for members of the public to visit and view non-exhibited items for a fee by booking onto one of the several Spirit Collection Tours offered daily.

Arguably the most famous creature in the centre is the 8.62-metre-long giant squid, affectionately named Archie.

=== The Attenborough Studio ===
As part of the museum's remit to communicate science education and conservation work, a new multimedia studio forms an important part of Darwin Centre Phase 2. In collaboration with the BBC's Natural History Unit (holder of the largest archive of natural history footage) the Attenborough Studio—named after the broadcaster Sir David Attenborough—provides a multimedia environment for educational events. The studio holds regular lectures and demonstrations, including free Nature Live talks on Fridays, Saturdays and Sundays.

== Major specimens and exhibits ==
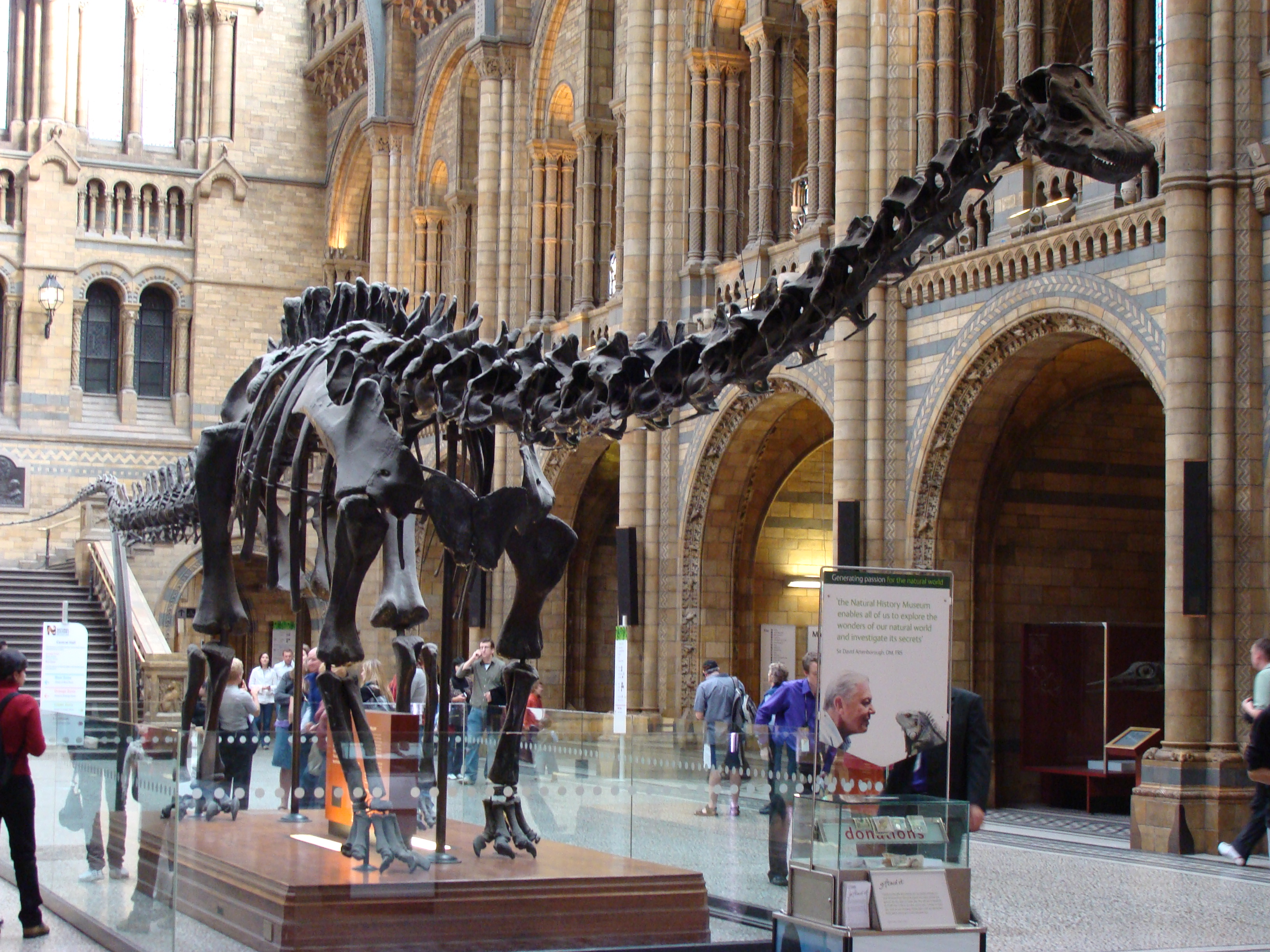
Dippy in the Hintze Hall at the Natural History Museum in 2008

One of the most famous and certainly most prominent of the exhibits—nicknamed "Dippy"—is a 105-foot (32 m)-long replica of a Diplodocus carnegii skeleton which was on display for many years within the central hall. The cast was given as a gift by the Scottish-American industrialist Andrew Carnegie, after a discussion with King Edward VII, then a keen trustee of the British Museum. Carnegie paid £2,000 (equivalent to £210,254 in 2025) for the casting, copying the original held at the Carnegie Museum of Natural History. The pieces were sent to London in 36 crates, and on 12 May 1905, the exhibit was unveiled to great public and media interest. The real fossil had yet to be mounted, as the Carnegie Museum in Pittsburgh was still being constructed to house it. As word of Dippy spread, Mr Carnegie paid to have additional copies made for display in most major European capitals and in Central and South America, making Dippy the most-viewed dinosaur skeleton in the world. The dinosaur quickly became an iconic representation of the museum, and has featured in many cartoons and other media, including the 1975 Disney comedy One of Our Dinosaurs Is Missing. After 112 years on display at the museum, the dinosaur replica was removed in early 2017 to be replaced by the actual skeleton of a young blue whale, a 128-year-old skeleton nicknamed "Hope". Dippy went on a tour of various British museums starting in 2018 and concluding in 2020 at Norwich Cathedral.

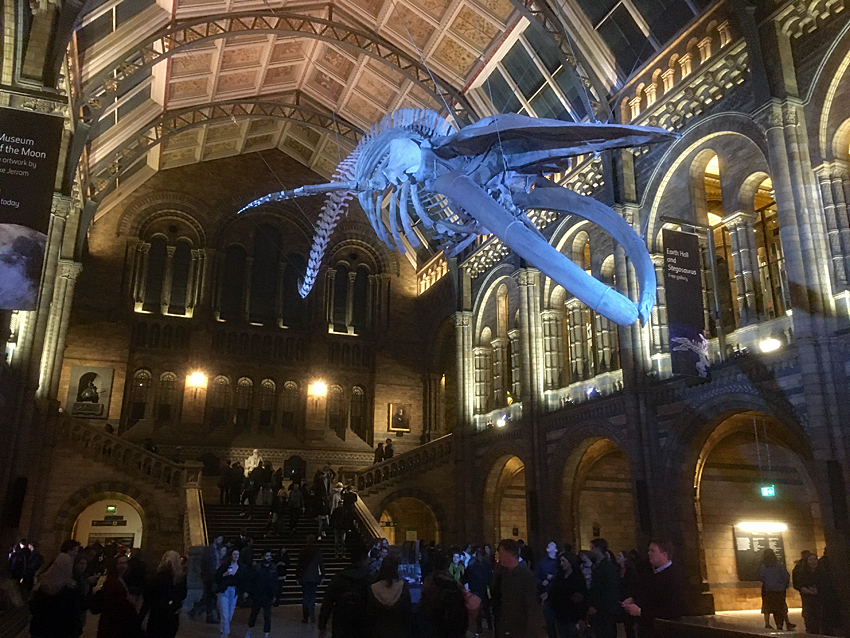
Whale skeleton, nicknamed Hope, in the Hintze Hall

The blue whale skeleton, Hope, that has replaced Dippy, is another prominent display in the museum. The display of the skeleton, some 82 feet (25 m) long and weighing 4.5 tonnes, was only made possible in 1934 with the building of the New Whale Hall (now the Mammals (blue whale model) gallery). The whale had been in storage for 42 years since its stranding on sandbanks at the mouth of Wexford Harbour, Ireland in March 1891 after being injured by whalers. At this time, it was first displayed in the Mammals (blue whale model) gallery, but now takes pride of place in the museum's Hintze Hall. Discussion of the idea of a life-sized model also began around 1934, and work was undertaken within the Whale Hall itself. Since taking a cast of such a large animal was deemed prohibitively expensive, scale models were used to meticulously piece the structure together. During construction, workmen left a trapdoor within the whale's stomach, which they would use for surreptitious cigarette breaks. Before the door was closed and sealed forever, some coins and a telephone directory were placed inside—this soon grew to an urban myth that a time capsule was left inside. The work was completed—entirely within the hall and in view of the public—in 1938. At the time it was the largest such model in the world, at 92 feet (28 m) in length. The construction details were later borrowed by several American museums, who scaled the plans further. The work involved in removing Dippy and replacing it with Hope was documented in a BBC Television special, Horizon: Dippy and the Whale, narrated by David Attenborough, which was first broadcast on BBC Two on 13 July 2017, the day before Hope was unveiled for public display.

The Darwin Centre is host to Archie, an 8.62-metre-long giant squid taken alive in a fishing net near the Falkland Islands in 2004. The squid is not on general display, but stored in the large tank room in the basement of the Phase 1 building. It is possible for members of the public to visit and view non-exhibited items behind the scenes for a fee by booking onto one of the several Spirit Collection Tours offered daily. On arrival at the museum, the specimen was immediately frozen while preparations commenced for its permanent storage. Since few complete and reasonably fresh examples of the species exist, "wet storage" was chosen, leaving the squid undissected. A 9.45-metre acrylic tank was constructed (by the same team that provide tanks to Damien Hirst), and the body preserved using a mixture of formalin and saline solution.

The museum holds the remains and bones of the "River Thames whale", a northern bottlenose whale that lost its way on 20 January 2006 and swam into the Thames. Although primarily used for research purposes, and held at the museum's storage site at Wandsworth.

Dinocochlea, one of the longer-standing mysteries of paleontology (originally thought to be a giant gastropod shell, then a coprolite, and now a concretion of a worm's tunnel), has been part of the collection since its discovery in 1921.

The museum keeps a wildlife garden on its west lawn, on which a potentially new species of insect resembling Arocatus roeselii was discovered in 2007.

== Galleries ==
The museum is divided into four sets of galleries, or zones, each colour coded to follow a broad theme.

=== Red Zone ===
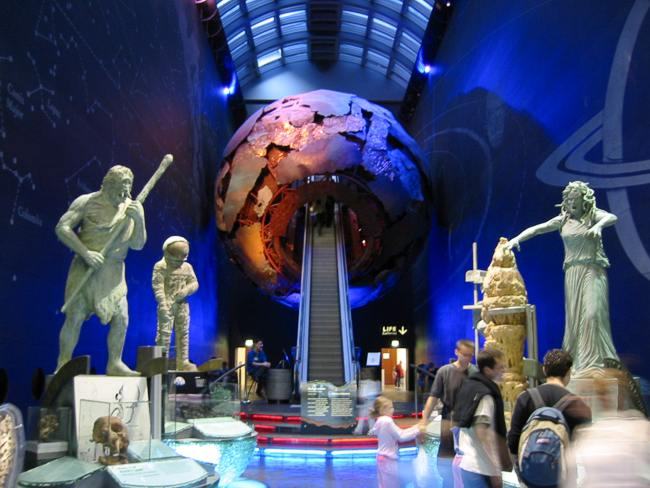
The entrance to the Earth Galleries, designed by Neal Potter

This is the zone that can be entered from Exhibition Road, on the East side of the building. It is a gallery themed around the changing history of the Earth.

Earth's Treasury shows specimens of rocks, minerals and gemstones behind glass in a dimly lit gallery. Lasting Impressions is a small gallery containing specimens of rocks, plants and minerals, of which most can be touched.

- Earth Hall (Stegosaurus skeleton)
- Human Evolution
- Earth's Treasury
- Lasting Impressions
- Restless Surface
- From the Beginning
- Volcanoes and Earthquakes

=== Green Zone ===
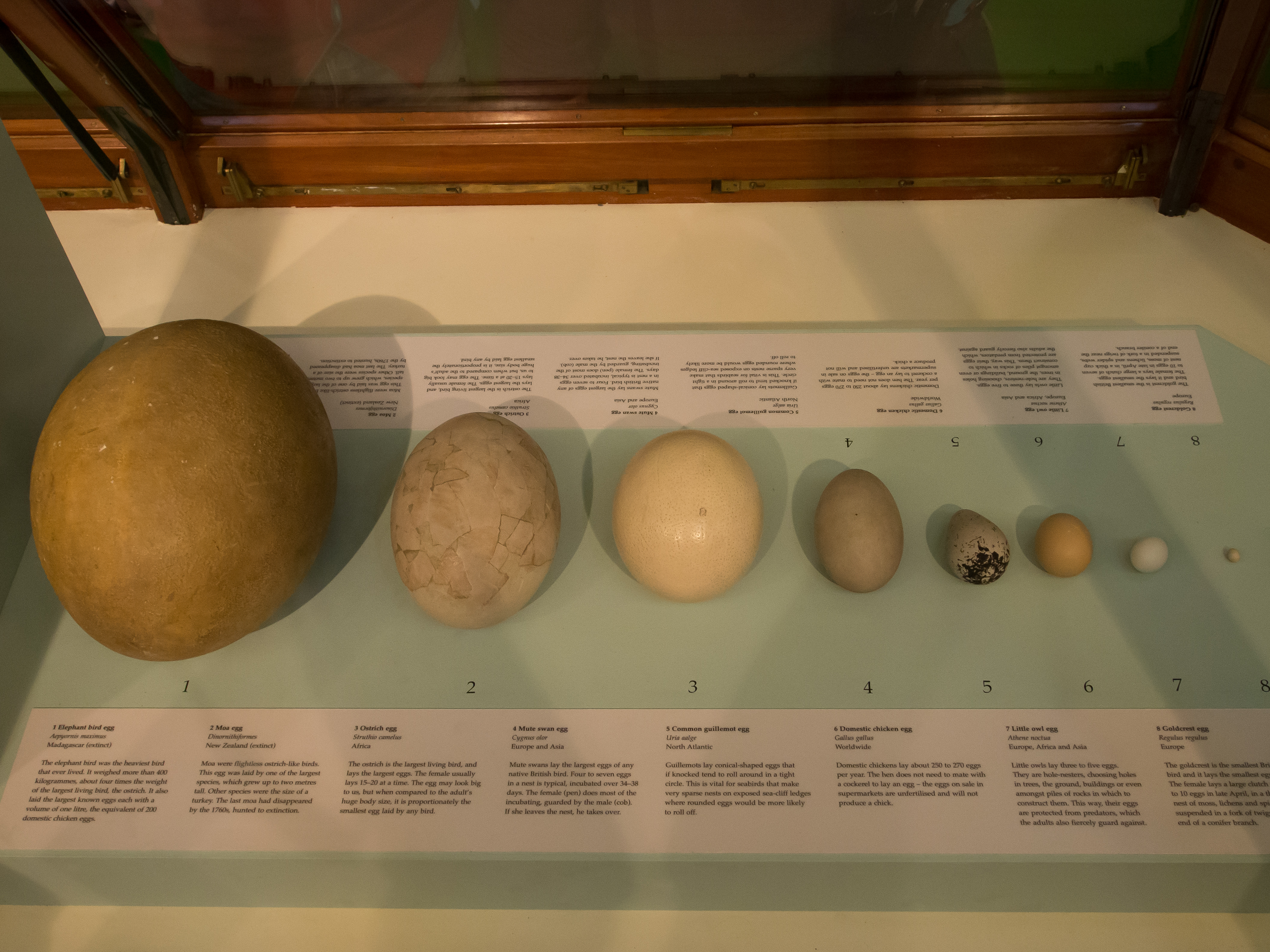
Group of bird's eggs, showing size range

This zone is accessed from the Cromwell Road entrance via the Hintze Hall and follows the theme of the evolution of the planet.

- Birds
- Creepy Crawlies
- Fossil Marine Reptiles (marine reptiles, a giant sloth, and the Swindon stegosaur Dacentrurus)
- Hintze Hall (formerly the Central Hall, with blue whale skeleton and giant sequoia)
- Minerals
- The Vault
- Fossils from the UK
- Anning Rooms (exclusive space for members and patrons of the museum)
- Investigate Centre
- East Pavilion (space for changing Wildlife Photographer of the Year exhibition)
- The Waterhouse Gallery (temporary exhibition space)

=== Blue Zone ===
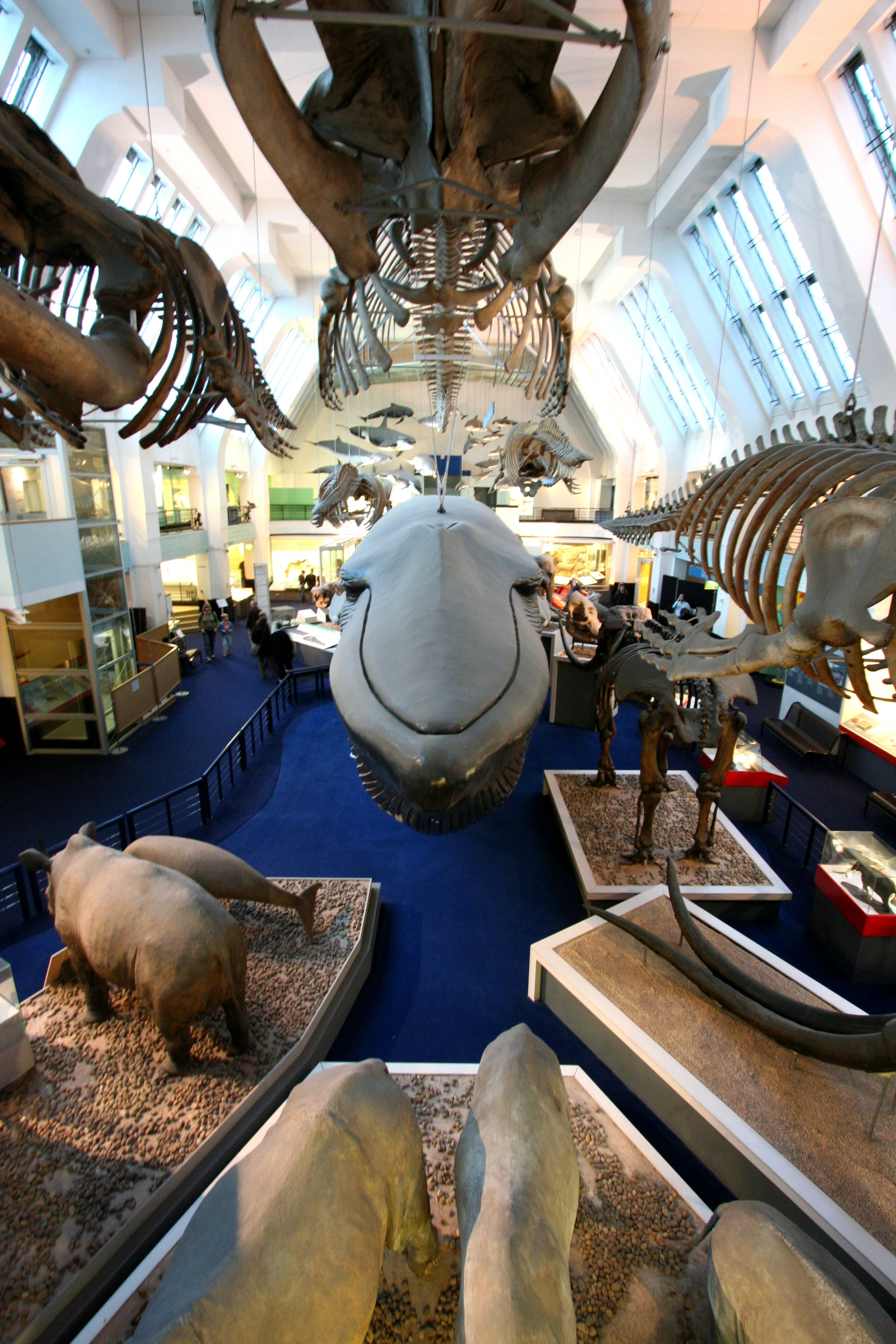
Large Mammals Hall

To the left of the Hintze Hall, this zone explores the diversity of life on the planet.

- Dinosaurs
- Fish, Amphibians and Reptiles
- Fixing Our Broken Planet
- Images of Nature
- The Jerwood Gallery (temporary exhibition space)
- Marine Invertebrates
- Mammals
- Mammals Hall (blue whale model)
- Treasures in the Cadogan Gallery

=== Orange Zone ===
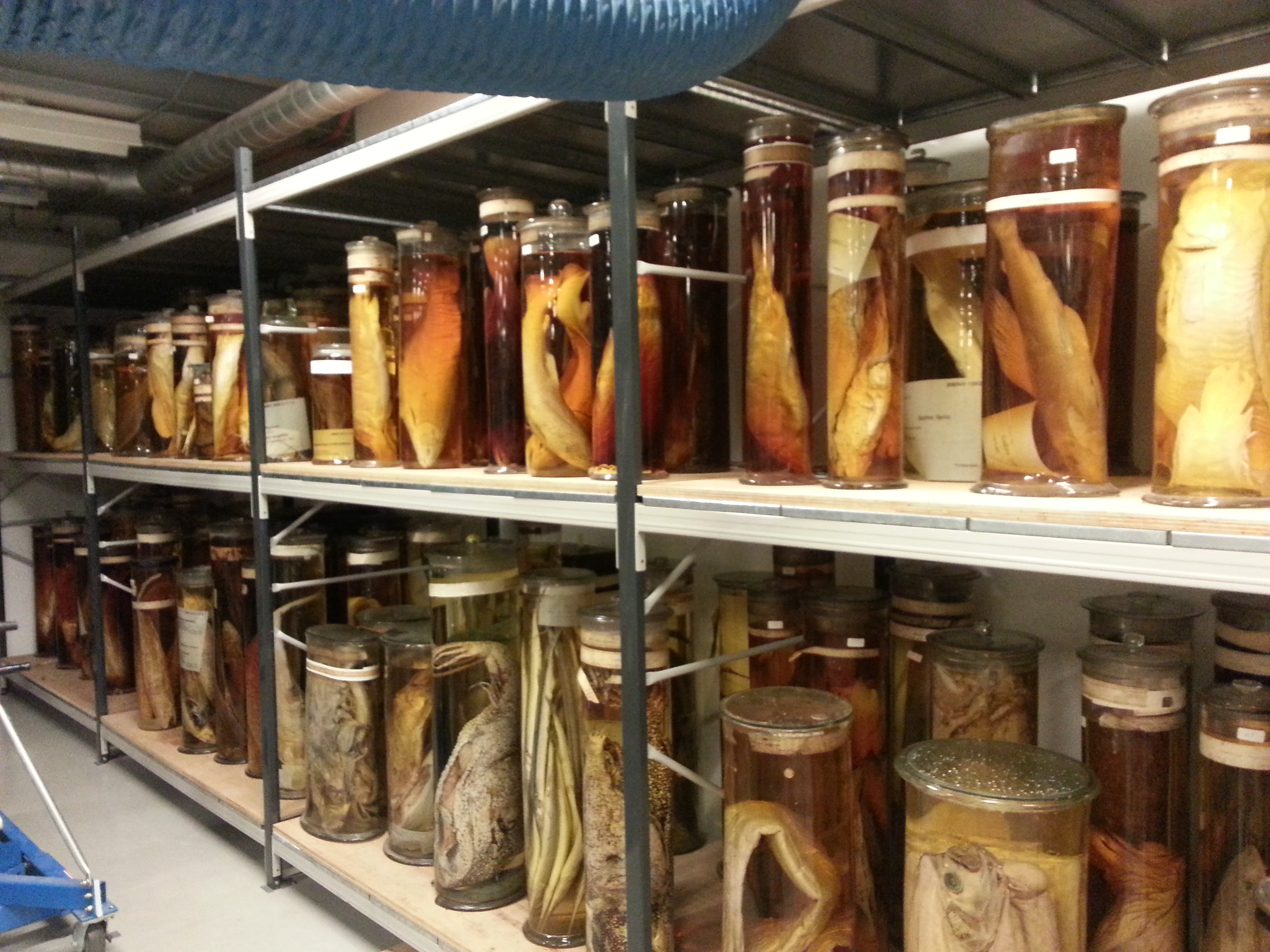
Part of the spirit collection

Enables the public to see science at work and also provides spaces for relaxation and contemplation. Accessible from Queens Gate.

- Wildlife Garden
- Darwin Centre
- Zoology Spirit Building
- Cocoon

== Highlights of the collection ==
- Otumpa iron meteorite weighing 635 kg (1,400 lb), found in 1783 in Campo del Cielo, Argentina
- Fragments of the Nakhla meteorite from Egypt, the first meteorite to suggest signs of aqueous processes on Mars
- Latrobe nugget, one of the largest known clusters of cubic gold crystals
- Duke of Devonshire Emerald, one of the largest uncut emeralds in the world
- Apollo 16 Moon rock sample collected in 1972
- Ostro Stone, flawless blue topaz gemstone weighing 9,381 carats, about 2 kg (4.4 lb), the largest of its kind in the world
- Aurora Pyramid of Hope, a collection of 296 natural diamonds in a wide variety of colours
- First complete ichthyosaur skull ever discovered (discovered by Joseph Anning in 1811)
- First complete skeleton of a plesiosaur ever discovered (discovered by Mary Anning in 1823)
- The plesiosaur Attenborosaurus
- Cast of a huge skeleton of Rhomaleosaurus
- First Iguanodon teeth ever discovered
- Near complete Mantellisaurus fossil skeleton
- The most complete Stegosaurus fossil skeleton ever discovered (nicknamed Sophie)
- Near complete Enigmacursor fossil skeleton
- Large skull of a Triceratops
- Skeleton of Baryonyx
- Full-sized animatronic model of a Tyrannosaurus rex
- First specimen of Archaeopteryx ever discovered, one of only 14 found and generally accepted by palaeontologists to be the oldest known bird
- Rare dodo skeleton, reconstructed from bones over 1,000 years old
- Only surviving specimen of the Great Auk from the British Isles, collected in 1813 from Papa Westray in the Orkney Islands
- A complete skeleton of an American mastodon
- Broken Hill skull, Middle Paleolithic cranium now considered part of a Homo heidelbergensis, discovered in the mine of Broken Hill or Kabwe in Zambia
- Gibraltar 1 and Gibraltar 2, two Neanderthal skulls found at Forbes' Quarry in Gibraltar
- Cross-section of 1,300-year-old giant sequoia, at the museum since 1893
- Rare copy of The Birds of America by John James Audubon, containing illustrations of a wide variety of birds from the United States
- Rare first edition of Charles Darwin's On the Origin of Species
- New dinosaur species discovered by the Natural History Museum, the Enigmacursor.

== Education and research ==
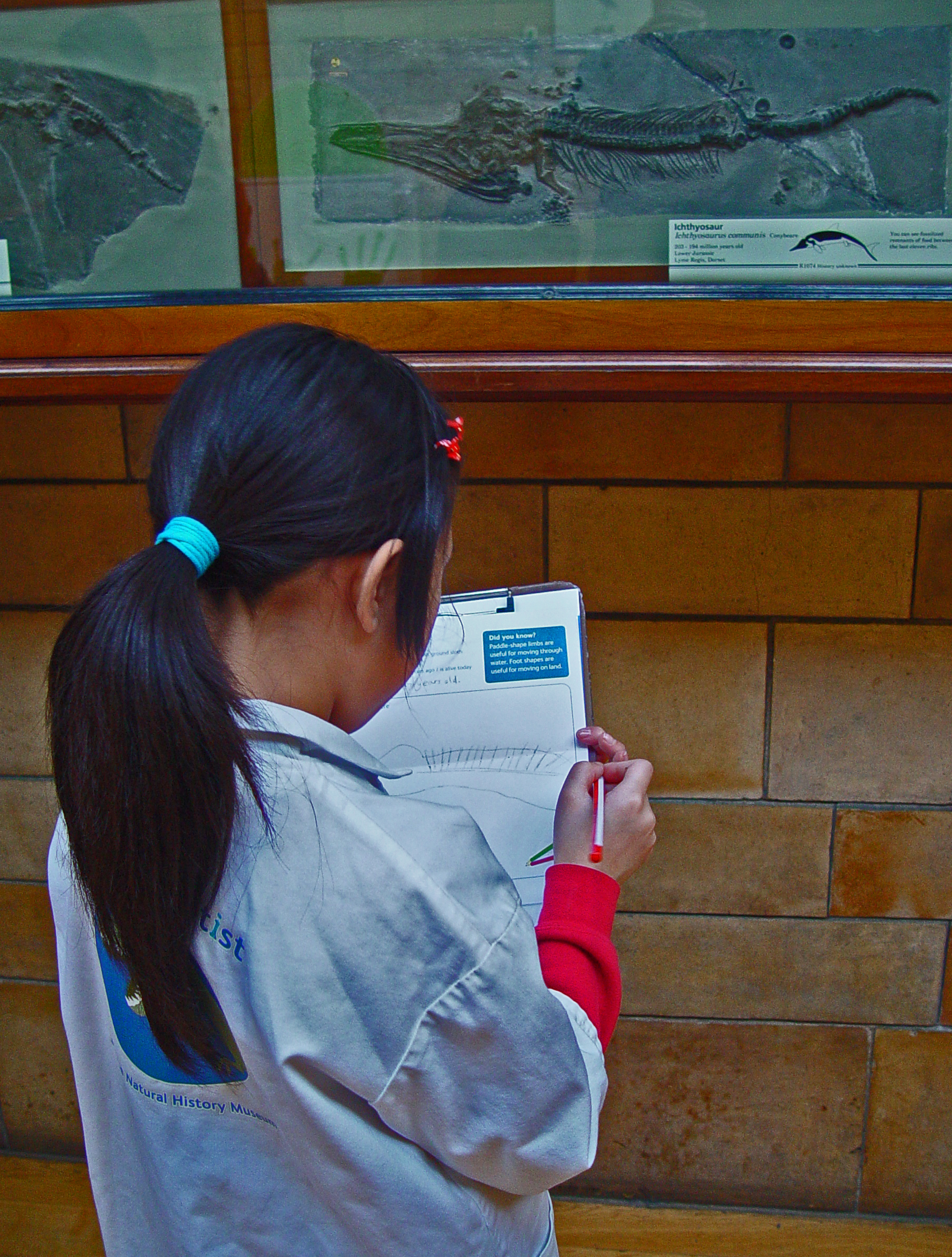
A young student at the museum

The museum runs a series of educational and public engagement programmes. These include for example a highly praised "How Science Works" hands on workshop for school students demonstrating the use of microfossils in geological research. The museum also played a major role in securing designation of the Jurassic Coast of Devon and Dorset as a UNESCO World Heritage Site and has subsequently been a lead partner in the Lyme Regis Fossil Festivals.

In 2005, the museum launched a project to develop notable gallery characters to patrol display cases, including 'facsimiles' of Carl Linnaeus, Mary Anning, Dorothea Bate and William Smith. They tell stories and anecdotes of their lives and discoveries and aim to surprise visitors.

In 2010, a six-part BBC documentary series was filmed at the museum entitled Museum of Life exploring the history and behind the scenes aspects of the museum.

Since May 2001, the Natural History Museum admission has been free for some events and permanent exhibitions. However, there are certain temporary exhibits and shows that require a fee.

The Natural History museum combines the museum's life and earth science collections with specialist expertise in "taxonomy, systematics, biodiversity, natural resources, planetary science, evolution and informatics" to tackle scientific questions. In 2011, the museum led the setting up of an International Union for Conservation of Nature Bumblebee Specialist Group, chaired by Dr. Paul H. Williams, to assess the threat status of bumblebee species worldwide using Red List criteria.

== Access ==
| Service | Station/Stop | Lines/Routes served |
|---|---|---|
| London Buses | Kensington Museums | 360 |
| London Buses | Victoria & Albert Museum | 14, 74, C1 |
| London Underground | South Kensington | Circle line District line Piccadilly line |

The closest London Underground station is South Kensington — there is a tunnel from the station that emerges close to the entrances of all three museums. Admission to the museum is free, though there are donation boxes in the foyer.

Museum Lane immediately to the north provides disabled access to the museum.

A connecting bridge between the Natural History and Science museums closed to the public in the late 1990s.

== In popular culture ==
The museum plays an important role in the 1975 London-based Disney live-action feature One of Our Dinosaurs Is Missing; the eponymous skeleton is stolen from the museum, and a group of intrepid nannies hide inside the mouth of the museum's blue whale model (in fact a specially created prop – the nannies peer out from behind the whale's teeth, but a blue whale is a baleen whale and has no teeth). Additionally, the film is set in the 1920s, before the blue whale model was built.

The museum was featured in the 2006 music video for the song, "Friday Night" by McFly, from the soundtrack to the movie, Night at the Museum. The video, shot with various handheld cameras, features the band members as security guards at the museum, and then running around London.

The museum features as a base for Prodigium, a secret society which studies and fights monsters, first appearing on The Mummy.

In the 2014 film Paddington, Millicent Clyde (played by Nicole Kidman) is a devious and treacherous taxidermist at the museum. She kidnaps Paddington, intending to kill and stuff him, but is thwarted by the Brown family after scenes involving chases inside and on the roof of the building.

The museum was prominently featured in the Sky One 2014 documentary David Attenborough's Natural History Museum Alive where several extinct creatures exhibited at the museum including Dippy the Diplodocus were brought to life using CGI.

The museum features prominently in the level Lud's Gate from Tomb Raider III, with Core Design launching the game with Jonathan Ross at the museum on 15 October 1998.

Andy Day's CBeebies shows, Andy's Dinosaur Adventures and Andy's Prehistoric Adventures are filmed in the Natural History Museum.

The museum was site of the first Pit Stop on The Amazing Race 33.

The museum is featured in the fifth episode of the Apple TV+ period drama The Essex Serpent.

The museum is featured in the music video for the song "Hordes of Khan", by the Swedish metal band, Sabaton. The song is about Genghis Khan. The video was inspired by Night at the Museum.

In March 2026 the museum was reported as the UK’s most visited attraction with over 7.1 million visitors in 2025.

== Natural History Museum at Tring ==
The NHM also has an outpost in Tring, Hertfordshire, built by local eccentric Lionel Walter Rothschild. The NHM took ownership in 1938. In 2007, the museum announced that the name would be changed to the Natural History Museum at Tring, though the older name, the Walter Rothschild Zoological Museum, is still in widespread use.

== Move of collections to Harwell or Shinfield ==
There has been some discussion of plans to move major parts of the collections to a site in Harwell (which was abandoned) and then to the Thames Valley Science Park in Shinfield, Berkshire. These plans have been criticised, together with the overall departure of the strategic direction of the museum. Construction of the Shinfield facility began in 2025. It is expected to be completed in 2027, with an opening date of 2031.

== See also ==
- James John Joicey
- Keeper of Entomology, Natural History Museum
- Sophie the Stegosaurus
- Category:Employees of the Natural History Museum, London

== Bibliography ==
- Dr Martin Lister: A bibliography by Geoffrey Keynes. St Paul's Bibliographies (UK). ISBN 0-906795-04-4. (Includes illustrations by Lister's wife and daughter).
- The Travelling Naturalists (1985) by Clare Lloyd. (Study of 18th Century Natural History – includes Charles Waterton, John Hanning Speke, Henry Seebohm and Mary Kingsley). Contains colour and black and white reproductions. Croom Helm (UK). ISBN 0-7099-1658-2.
- Dry storeroom no 1: The Secret Life of the Natural History Museum (2009) by Richard Fortey. HarperPress (UK). ISBN 978-0307275523.
- Nature's Cathedral: A celebration of the Natural History Museum building (2020) by John Thackray, Bob Press and Sandra Knapp. Natural History Museum. ISBN 978 0 565 09483 6
