= Maurice Samuel Ostro =

British entrepreneur and philanthropist (born 1965)

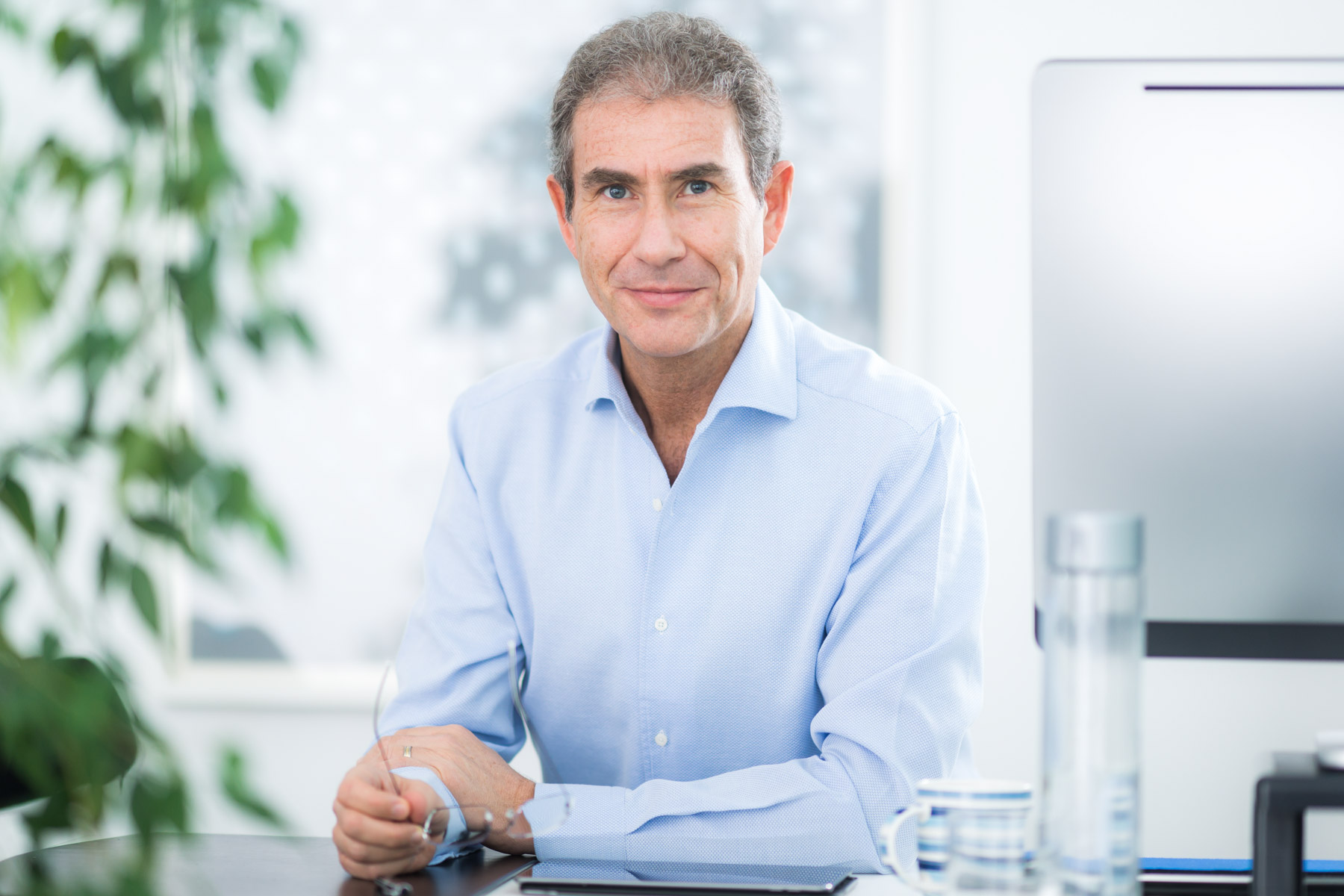
- Born: 16 February 1965 (age 61)
- Education: Oxford University, Wadham College
- Occupations: Entrepreneur & Philanthropist
- Known for: Business, charity and interfaith relations
- Spouse: Katy Ostro
- Children: Eliana Ostro, Tamara Ostrowiecki and Michael Ostro

Maurice Samuel Ostro OBE (born 16 February 1965) is a British entrepreneur and philanthropist. His business interests have included gemstones, media distribution, property, frozen yogurt, airline catering and logistics. His philanthropic activities include supporting entrepreneurship, interfaith relations and economic development.

Ostro was awarded the OBE (Order of the British Empire) in 2014, for services to business, charity and interfaith relations. He has also been appointed a KFO (Knight of the Royal Order of Francis I).

== Education ==
Ostro is an alumnus of the Gemological Institute of America, Harvard Business School and New York University. In 1987 he gained a Masters in Jurisprudence at Oxford University’s Wadham College and was then admitted to the New York Bar in 1988.

== Business career ==
Ostro started his career in the gemstone industry after becoming a graduate gemologist in the early 1980s.

In 1992, he founded a frozen yogurt company called Glasay International PLC. The company became the largest supplier of frozen yogurt to the airline sector. Glasay was sold in 2001.

He founded Air Fayre, an airline catering company in 1999. Air Fayre was sold to Watermark PLC in 2004.

In 2002, Ostro founded Media on the Move, to supply media content to airlines, shipping companies and train lines. It was sold to Watermark PLC in 2003. In 2006, with Ostro already serving as managing director of two of the company’s divisions, Watermark appointed him as its CEO.

Upon his Father’s death in 2010, Ostro assumed responsibility for the UK operations of the family gemstone business, Ostro Minerals.

== Philanthropy ==
Ten percent of Ostro’s companies’ profits go to charities. He's also the founder of the charity, the Ostro Fayre Share Foundation.

In 2008, Ostro became a Vice Chair of the Council of Christians and Jews. He was the initiator and Organising Committee Chair for the then London Mayor Boris Johnson's first Interfaith Conference in 2010. Ostro then instigated and funded the creation of the Faiths Forum for London. He also created Entrepreneurial Giving, a movement that encourages businesses towards charity work.

In 2014, Ostro funded and supported the co-location of multiple charities working in the same sector through the creation of a charitable working space called Collaboration House. Working with some of these charities and the Ministry of Housing, Communities and Local Government (MHCLG), his foundation provides training to over 800 religious institutions, through a nationwide initiative called Strengthening Faith Institutions (SFI).

In the wake of COVID-19, Ostro formed the Business Action Council (BAC), a coalition of multiple business organisations in the UK, developing recommendations for the Government on assisting small businesses and entrepreneurs.

== Governmental experience ==
- Since 2014, Ostro has served on the Education Expert Group for the Prime Minister's Commission on the Holocaust
- From 2003 to 2005, Ostro was part of Prime Minister Tony Blair's Strategy Unit on improving life chances of disabled people
- From 2001 to 2005 he served on the SME Board of the National Employment Panel of the Department for Work and Pensions

== Personal life ==
Maurice is married to Katy.
