= Dippy =

Diplodocus fossil

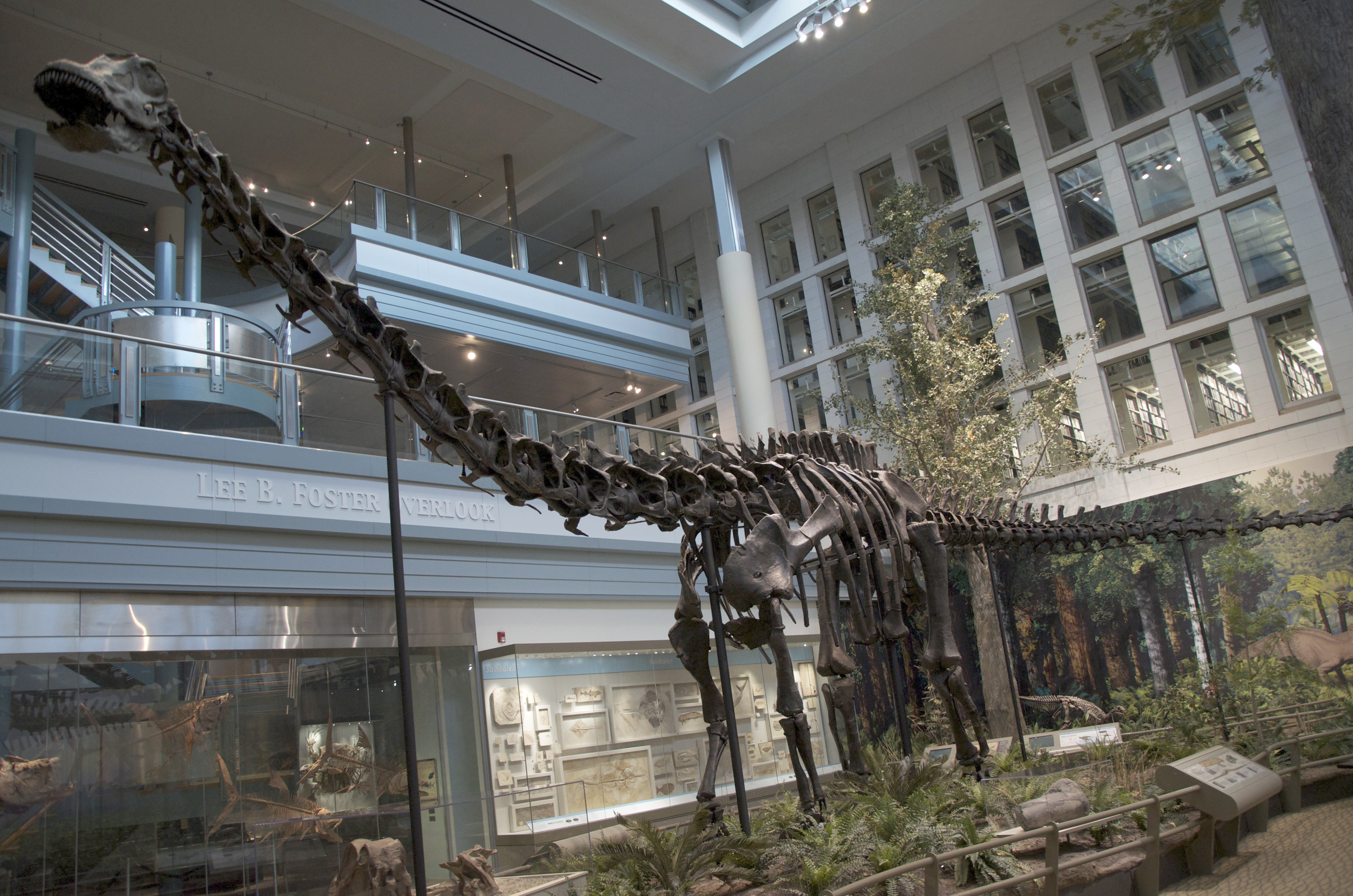
- Catalog no.: CM 84
- Common name: Dippy
- Species: Diplodocus carnegii
- Age: ~150 million years
- Place discovered: Sheep Creek Quarry D, near Medicine Bow, Wyoming; upper 10 m (33 ft) of the Talking Rock facies of the Brushy Basin Member of the Morrison Formation
- Date discovered: 4 July 1899; 127 years ago
- Discovered by: William Reed

Dippy is a composite Diplodocus skeleton. The original skeleton is in Pittsburgh's Carnegie Museum of Natural History, and the holotype of the species Diplodocus carnegii. It is considered the most famous single dinosaur skeleton in the world, due to the numerous plaster casts donated by Andrew Carnegie to several major museums around the world at the beginning of the 20th century. One well known cast in the United Kingdom was displayed at the Natural History Museum in London from 1905 until 2017.

The casting and distribution of the skeleton made the word dinosaur a household word; for millions of people it became the first dinosaur they had ever seen. It was also responsible for the subsequent popularity of the entire genus Diplodocus, since the skeleton has been on display in more places than any other sauropod dinosaur.

Its discovery was catalyzed by the announcement of the excavation of a large thigh bone (unrelated to Dippy) by William Reed near Medicine Bow, Wyoming in December 1898. On a return trip financed by Carnegie, Reed excavated Sheep Creek Quarry D in which he found the first part of Dippy's skeleton, a toe bone, on July 4, 1899. Its discovery on Independence Day, and its use in American diplomacy via Carnegie's international donations of replicas, led to its being nicknamed the "star-spangled dinosaur". Dippy became the centrepiece of the Carnegie Museum of Natural History, such that the museum became known as "the house that Dippy built".

In 2016, a petition to the International Commission on Zoological Nomenclature was being considered which proposed to make Diplodocus carnegii the new type species of Diplodocus. The proposal was rejected in 2018, and Diplodocus longus has been maintained as the type species.

== Discovery ==
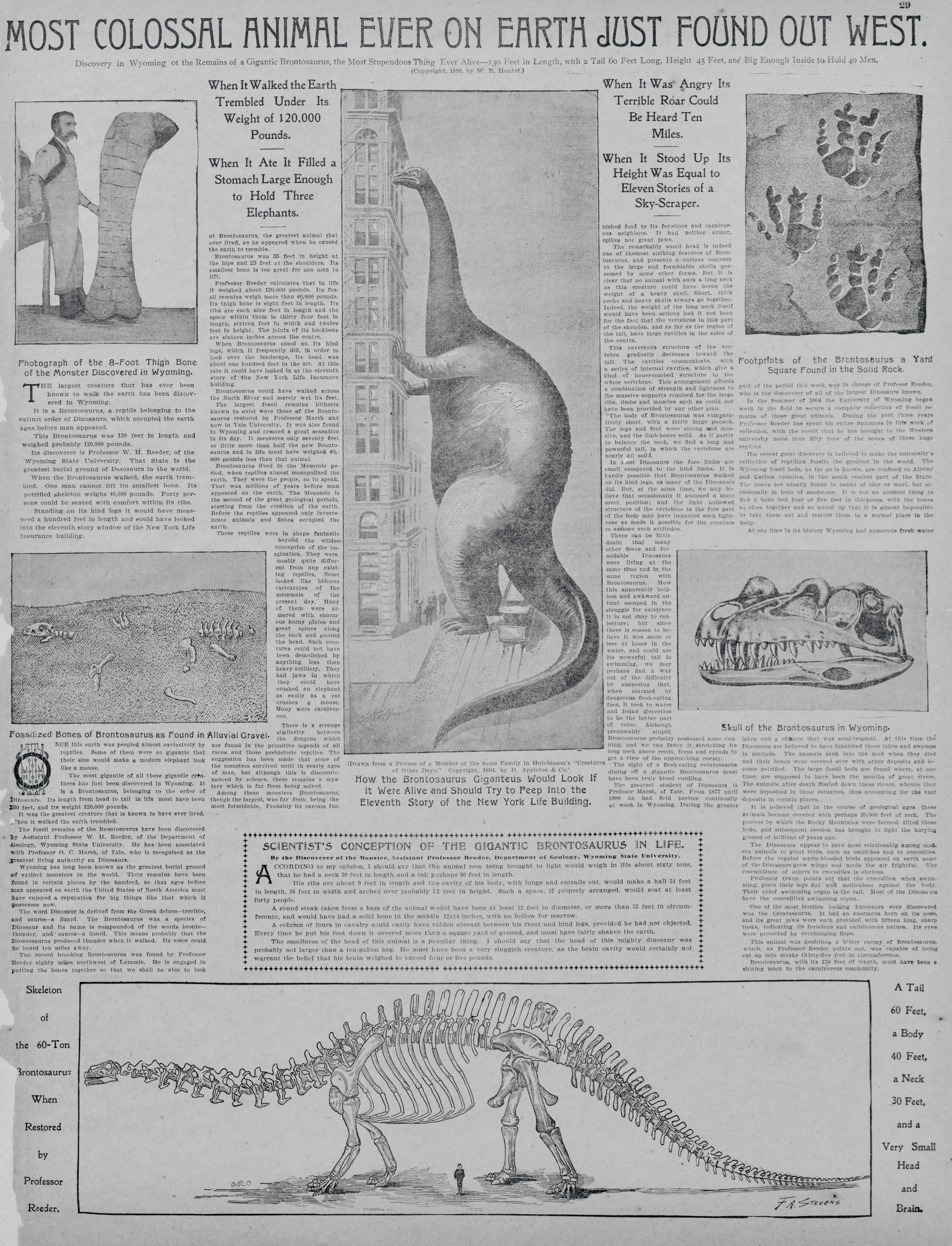
Discovery of a large thigh bone, announced in the New York Journal and Advertiser on December 11, 1898. It was this article which first caught Carnegie's attention; in the margin of his copy he wrote to William Holland: “can you buy this for Pittsburgh?” The fanciful pictures were scaled up versions of Marsh's 1883 drawing of Brontosaurus.

The genus Diplodocus was first described in 1878 by Othniel Charles Marsh. The skeleton was found in 1898 in the upper 10 metres (33 ft) of the Talking Rock facies of the Brushy Basin Member of the Morrison Formation, in Albany County, Wyoming.

In 1900, John Bell Hatcher was hired by William Jacob Holland as curator of paleontology and osteology for the Carnegie Museum of Natural History, succeeding Jacob Lawson Wortman. Hatcher supervised the field expeditions, excavations, investigation and display of Dippy, and named the species for Carnegie. Hatcher's monograph on the find was published in 1901 as Diplodocus Marsh: Its Osteology, Taxonomy, and Probable Habits, with a Restoration of the Skeleton.

It is a composite skeleton comprising:

- CM 84: the majority of the skeleton, named Diplodocus carnegii, and published in 1901 by Hatcher
- CM 94: supplemented missing bones
- CM 307: the tail
- CM 662 and USNM 2673: skull elements. In 2015, the USNM skull was recategorized as Galeamopus, along with several other Diplodocus skulls, leaving no definite Diplodocus skulls known.
- some foot and limb bones of a Camarasaurus

== Pittsburgh display ==
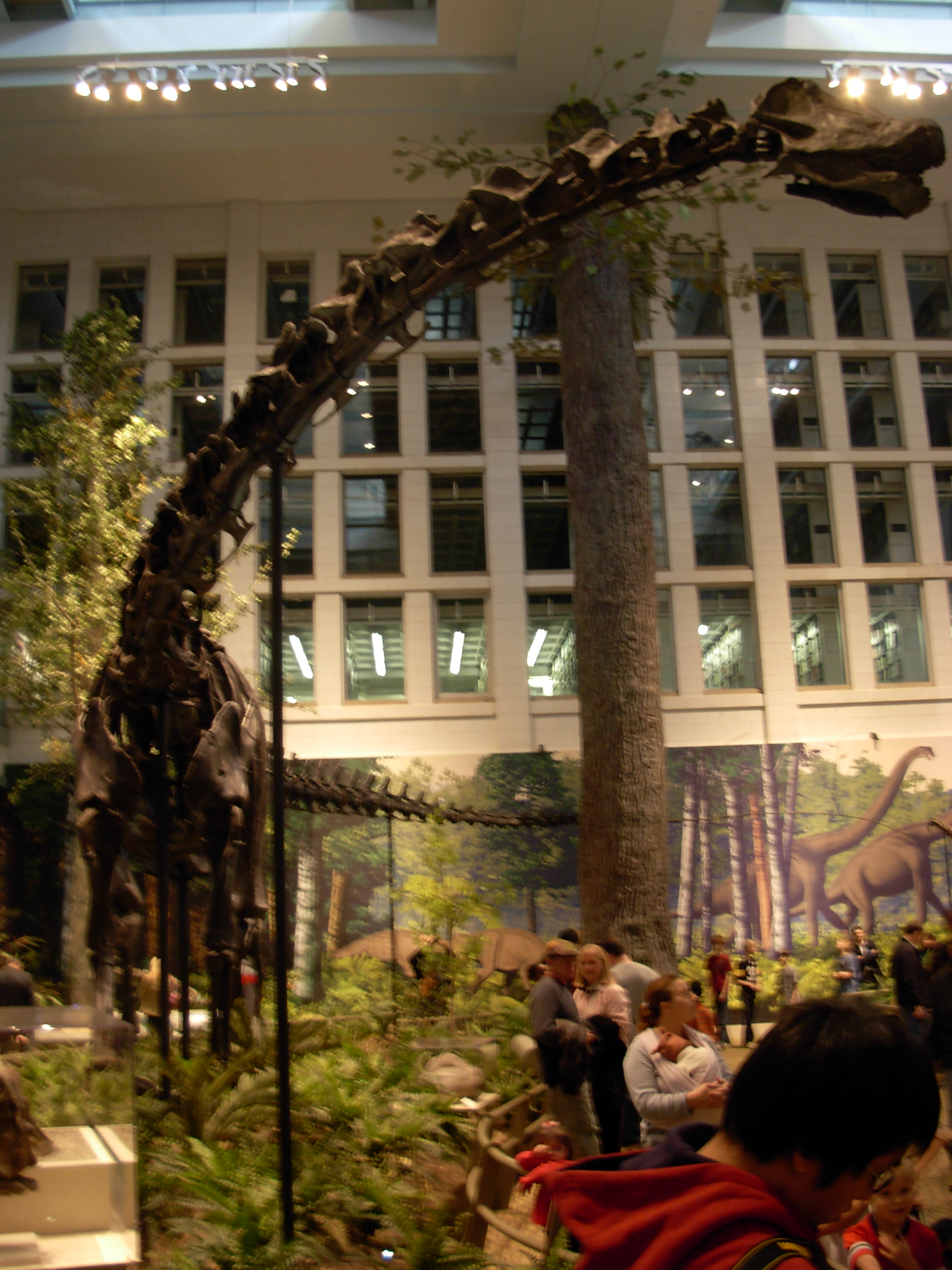
Dippy on display at the Carnegie Museum of Natural History

The original skeleton has been on display at the Carnegie Museum of Natural History since April 1907, two years after the first cast was shown. The delay was due to construction work at the Pittsburgh museum, which needed expansion in order to house Dippy. Today, the skeleton is part of the Dinosaurs in Their Time exhibition.

== Casts ==
=== Background ===
Industrialist Andrew Carnegie financed the acquisition of the skeleton in 1898, as well as the donation of the casts at the beginning of the 20th century. Carnegie paid to have casts made for display in many European capitals – including Berlin, Paris, Vienna, Bologna, St Petersburg and Madrid; one sent to Munich was never erected – as well as Mexico City and La Plata in Argentina, making Dippy the most-viewed dinosaur skeleton in the world.

His great-grandson, William Thomson, was quoted in 2019 explaining the donations: "By gifting copies to the heads of state of seven other countries as well as the UK, Carnegie hoped to demonstrate through mutual interest in scientific discoveries that nations have more in common than what separates them. He used his gifts in an attempt to open inter state dialogue on preserving world peace – a form of Dinosaur diplomacy."

As director of the Carnegie Museums, William Holland supervised the donations of the casts. His trip to Argentina in 1912 was recorded by Holland in his 1913 travel book To the River Plate and Back. Holland noted a poem which had become popular among college students:

Crowned heads of Europe
All make a royal fuss
Over Uncle Andy
And his old diplodocus.

=== List of casts ===
List of Dippy casts
Date	Location	Material	Description	Image
May 12, 1905	Natural History Museum, London	Plaster cast	The first cast. Removed 2017.	
May 1908	Museum für Naturkunde, Berlin	Plaster cast		
June 15, 1908	French National Museum of Natural History, Paris	Plaster cast		
1909	Natural History Museum in Vienna, Austria	Plaster cast		
1909	Giovanni Capellini Museum for Paleontology and Geology in Bologna, Italy	Plaster cast	Skulls from this cast (i.e., 'second-generation') are on display in museums in Milan and Naples.	
1910	Zoological Museum of the Russian Academy of Sciences in St. Petersburg, Russia	Plaster cast	Cast later moved to Moscow Paleontological Museum.	
1912	Museo de la Plata in La Plata near Buenos Aires, Argentina	Plaster cast	The caster was donated to the country via president Saenz Peña and mounted by W. J. Holland	
November 1913	National Natural History Museum in Madrid, Spain	Plaster cast		
1930	Museo de Paleontología in Mexico City	Plaster cast		
1932	Paleontological Museum in Munich, Germany	Plaster cast	Donated in 1932, but still unmounted.	
1989	Utah Field House of Natural History State Park Museum	Fibreglass and polyester cast		
1999	Carnegie Museum of Natural History (outside)	Fibreglass cast	Outside the building in which the original skeleton is displayed; further details at Dippy (statue).	
2024	Natural History Museum, London	Bronze cast	Outside in garden. Nicknamed Fern.	

== London cast ==
=== Early history ===
The London cast of Dippy came about when King Edward VII, then a keen trustee of the British Museum, saw a sketch of the bones at Carnegie's Scottish home, Skibo Castle, in 1902, and Carnegie agreed to donate a cast to the Natural History Museum as a gift. Carnegie paid £2,000 for the casting in plaster of paris, copying the original fossil bones held by the Carnegie Museum (not mounted until 1907, as a new museum building was still being constructed to house it).

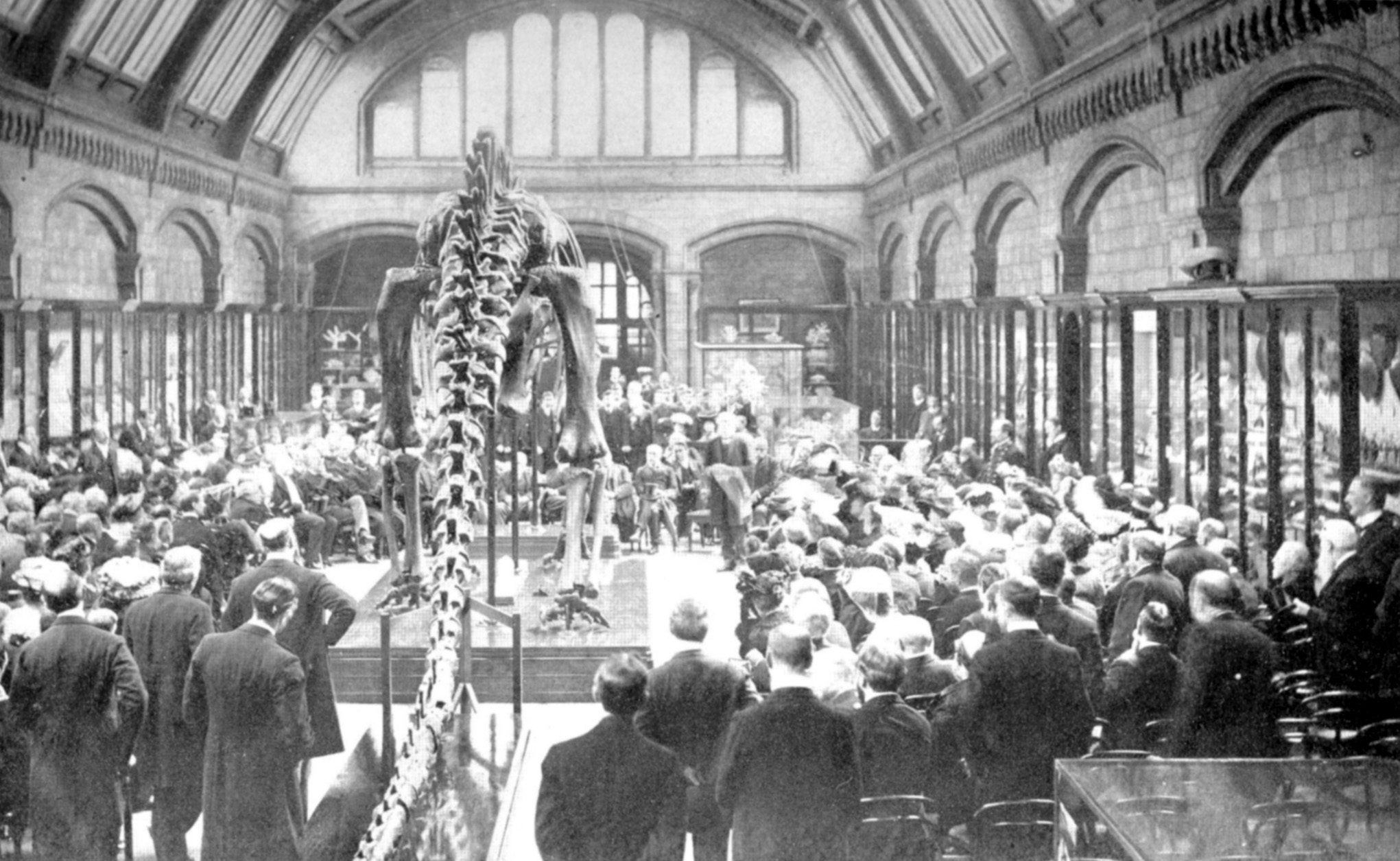
Unveiling ceremony at the Reptile Gallery of the Natural History Museum in 1905

The 292 cast pieces of the skeleton were sent to London in 36 crates, and the 25.6 metres (84 ft) long exhibit was unveiled on May 12, 1905, to great public and media interest, with speeches from the museum director Professor Ray Lankester, Andrew Carnegie, Lord Avebury on behalf of the trustees, the director of the Carnegie Museum William Jacob Holland, and finally the geologist Sir Archibald Geikie. The cast was mounted in the museum's Reptile Gallery to the left of the main hall (until recently the gallery of Human Biology) as it was too large to display in the Fossil Marine Reptile Gallery (to the right of the main hall).

Dippy was taken to pieces and stored in the museum's basement during the Second World War to protect it from bomb damage, and reinstalled in the Reptile Gallery after the war. The original presentation of the cast was altered several times to reflect changes in scientific opinion on the animal's stance. The head and neck were originally posed in a downwards position, and were later moved to a more horizontal position in the 1960s. The cast in London became an iconic representation of the museum, and has featured in cartoons and other media, including the 1975 Disney comedy One of Our Dinosaurs Is Missing.

=== Move to Hintze Hall ===
Dippy was removed from the Reptile Gallery in 1979 and repositioned as the centrepiece of the main central hall of the museum, later renamed the Hintze Hall in recognition of a large donation by Michael Hintze. Dippy replaced a mounted African elephant, nicknamed George, which had been on display as the central exhibit in the main hall since 1907, with various other animal specimens. The elephant had itself replaced the skeleton of a sperm whale which was the first significant exhibit in the hall and had been on display since at least 1895: earlier, the hall had been left largely empty. Dippy was originally displayed alongside a cast of a Triceratops skeleton, which was removed around 1993. The tail of the Diplodocus cast was also lifted to waft over the heads of visitors; originally it drooped to trail along the floor.

=== Removal from Natural History Museum and tour ===
After 112 years on display at the museum, the dinosaur replica was removed in early 2017 to be replaced by the 25 m (82 ft) long skeleton of a young blue whale, dubbed "Hope". The whale had been stranded on sandbanks at the mouth of Wexford Harbour, Ireland in March 1891. Its skeleton was acquired by the museum and had been displayed in the Large Mammals Hall (originally the New Whale Hall) since 1934.

The work involved in removing Dippy and replacing it with the whale skeleton was documented in a BBC Television special, Horizon: Dippy and the Whale, narrated by David Attenborough, which was first broadcast on BBC Two on July 13, 2017, the day before the whale skeleton was unveiled for public display.

Dippy started a tour of British museums in February 2018, mounted on a new, more mobile armature. Dippy has been on display at locations around the United Kingdom:

Dippy on Tour

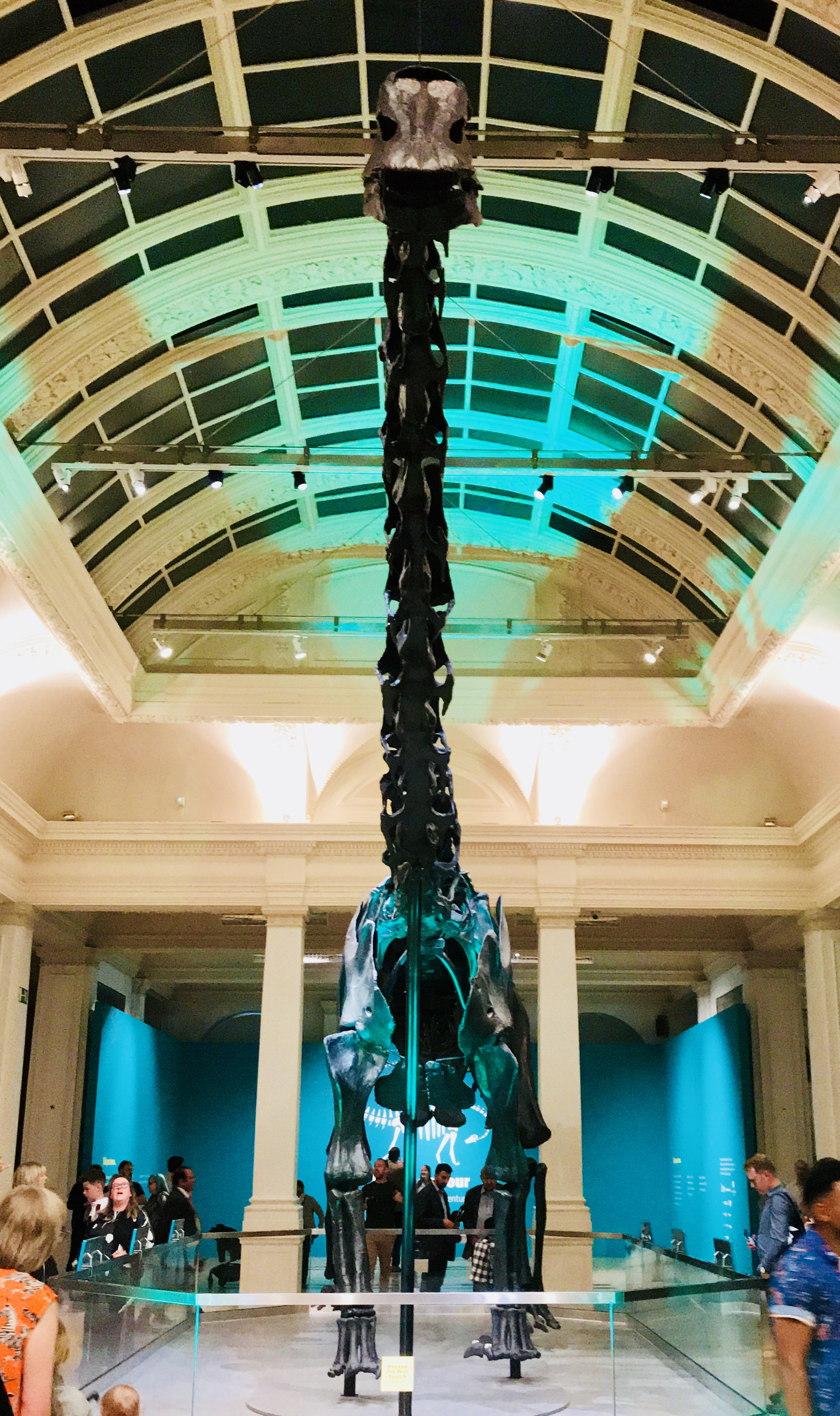
Dippy at Birmingham Museum and Art Gallery in May 2018

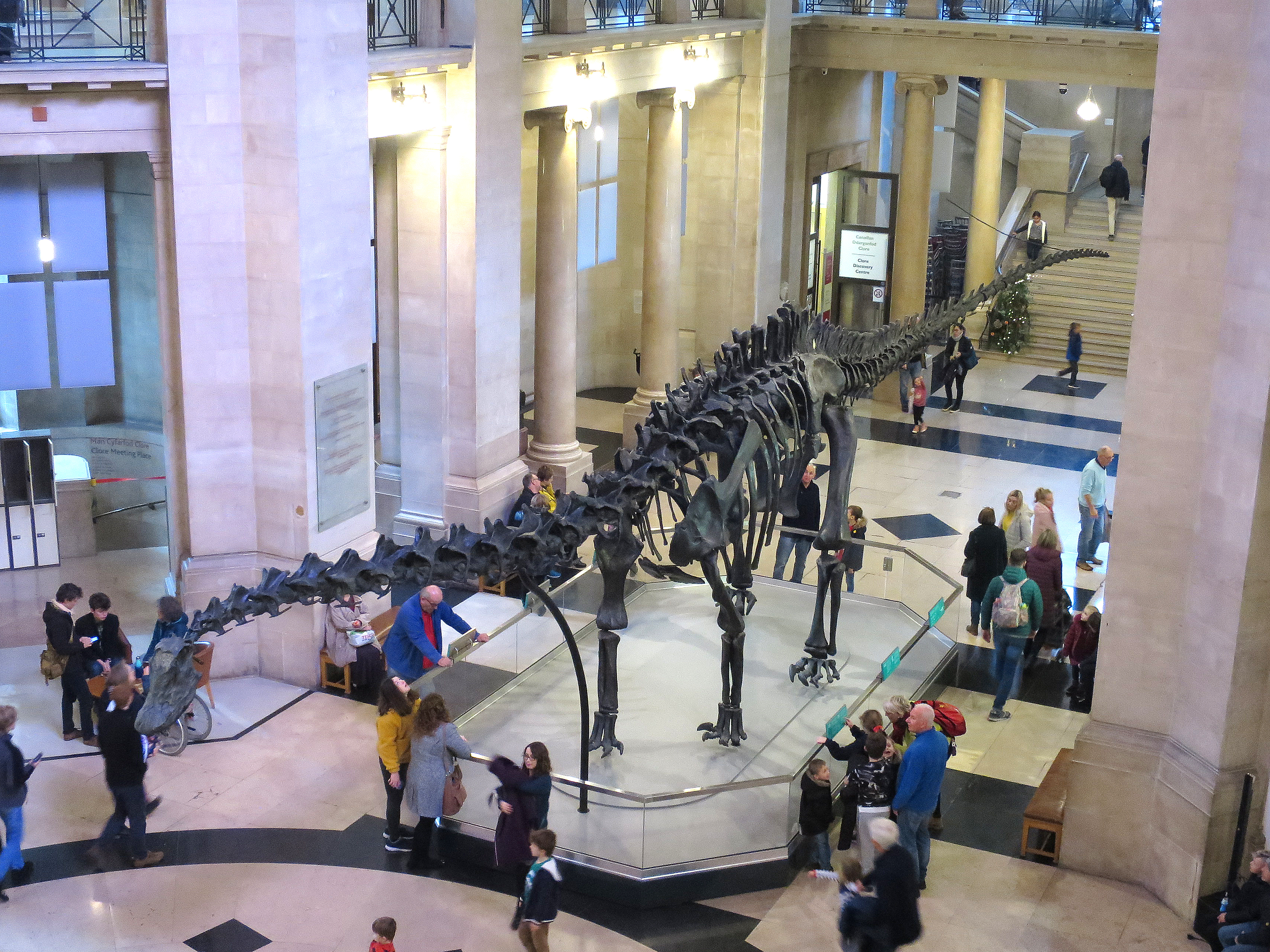
Dippy at the National Museum Cardiff in October 2019

- Dorset County Museum, Dorchester (10 February – 7 May 2018)
- Birmingham Museum and Art Gallery (26 May – 9 September 2018)
- Ulster Museum, Belfast (17 September 2018 – 6 January 2019)
- Kelvingrove Art Gallery and Museum, Glasgow (22 January – 6 May 2019)
- Great North Museum, Newcastle upon Tyne (18 May – 6 October 2019)
- National Museum Cardiff (19 October 2019 – 26 January 2020)
- Number One Riverside, Rochdale (10 February – 26 March and 7 September – 12 December 2020)
- Norwich Cathedral (13 July – 30 October 2021)

Dippy returned to the Natural History Museum as part of a temporary exhibition in June 2022. In February 2023, it was moved to Coventry as a long-term loan to the Herbert Art Gallery and Museum in 2023. A new bronze cast of Dippy, named Fern, has stood in the garden of the Natural History Museum since 2024.

== Gallery ==
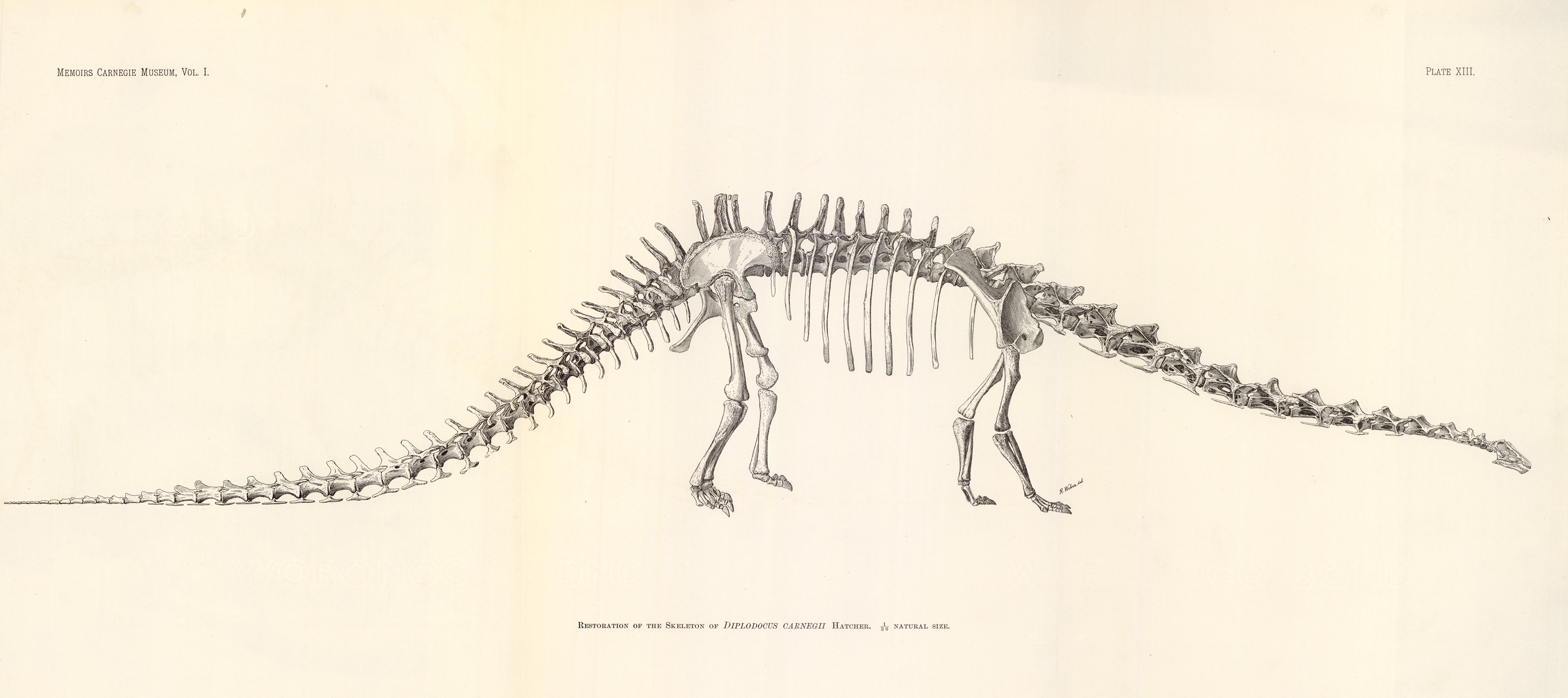
John Bell Hatcher's 1901 lithograph of Dippy, from the first issue of Memoirs of the Carnegie Museum of Natural History

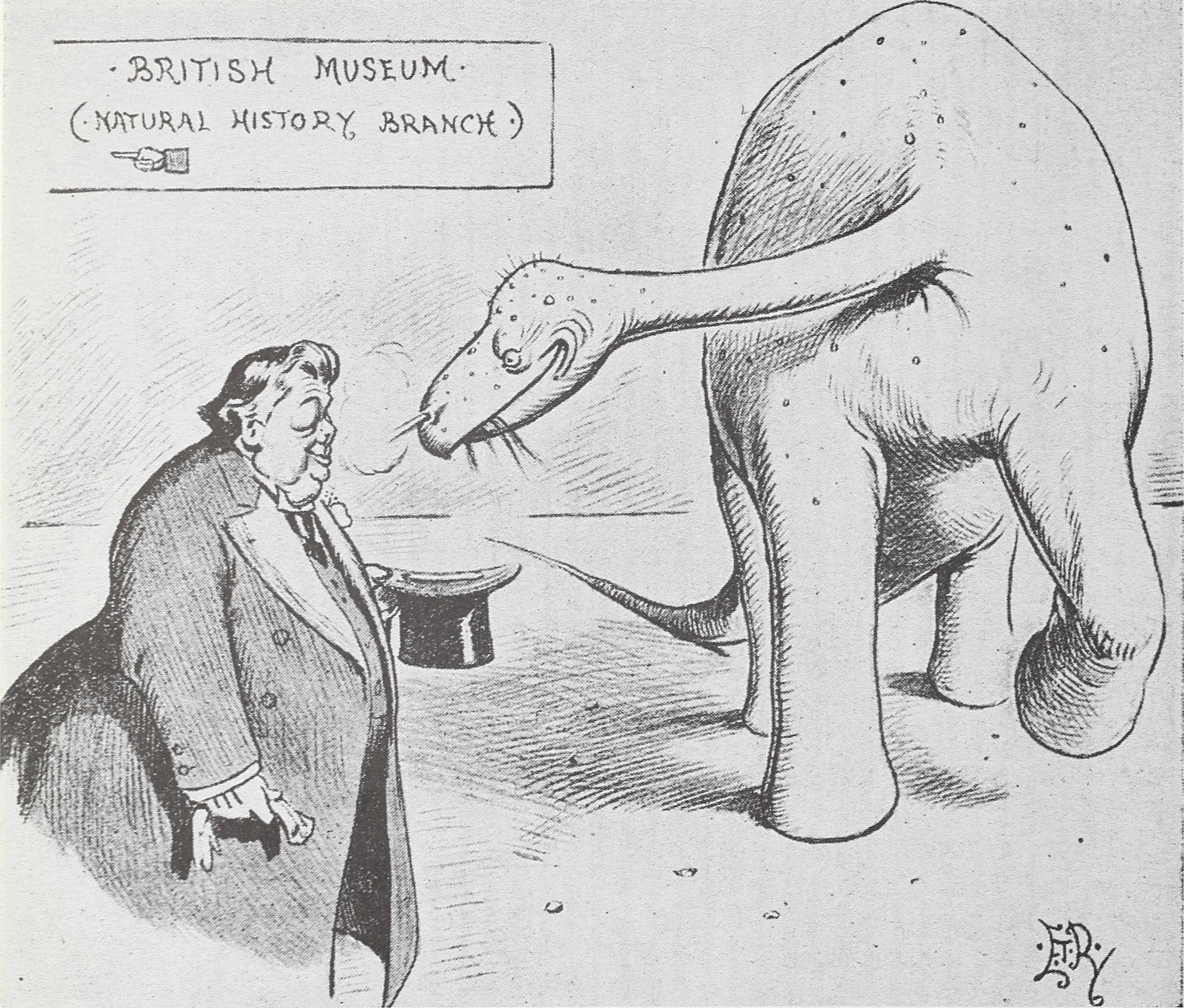
1905 (24 May) Punch cartoon by Edward Tennyson Reed of Dippy with Natural History Museum director Ray Lankester

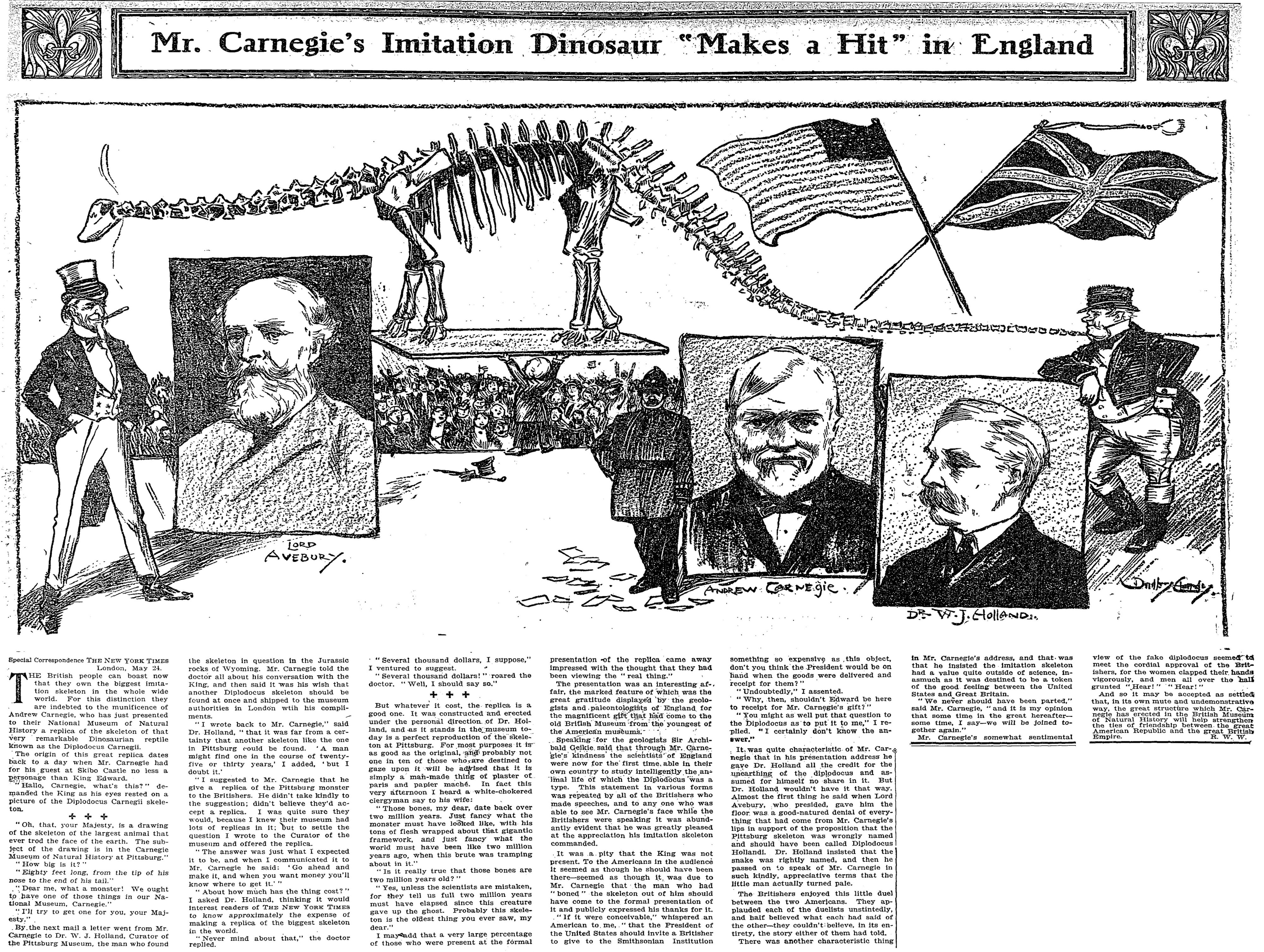
1905 (June 4) New York Times coverage of the London cast

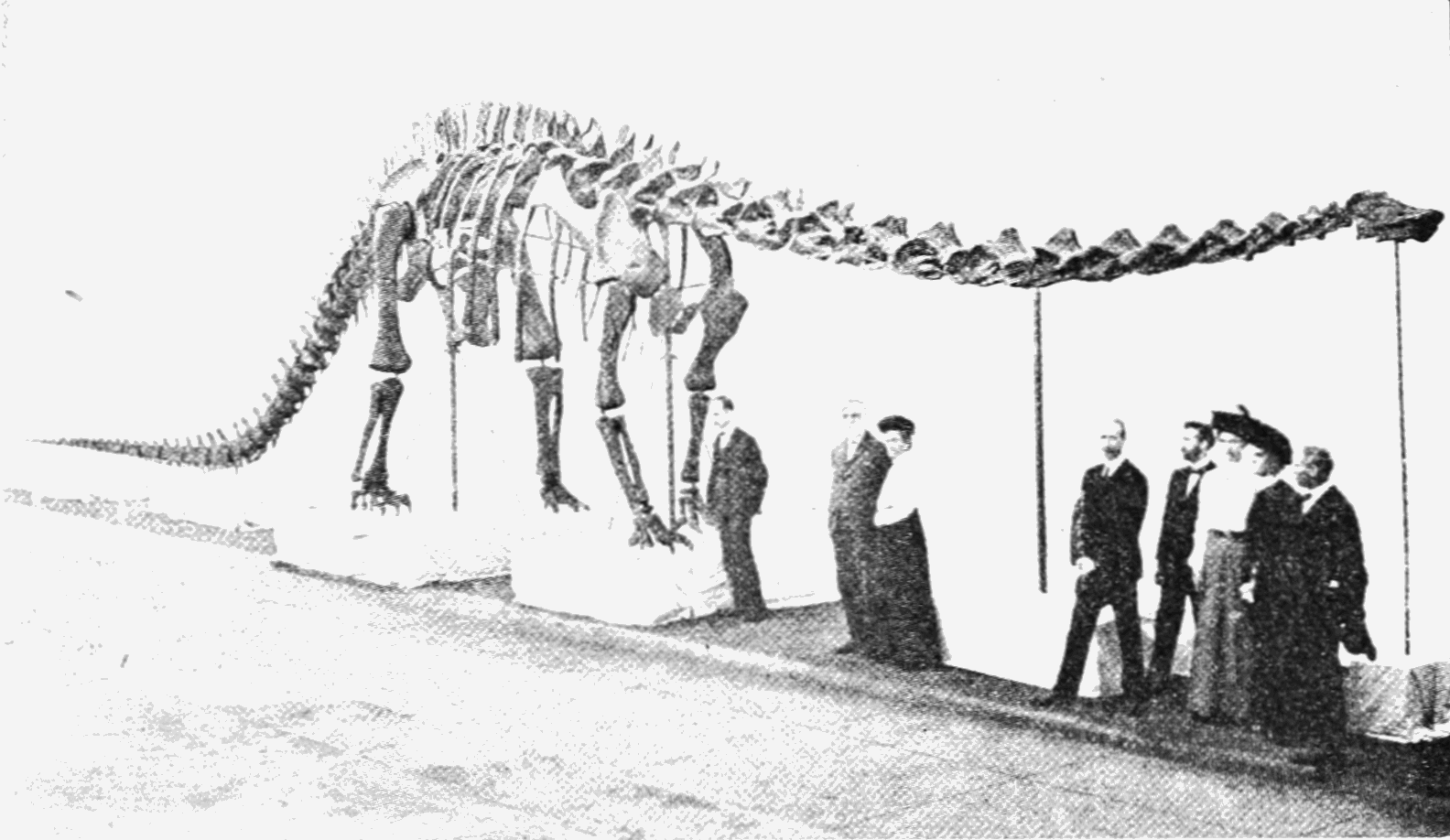
1908, at the Carnegie Museum in Pittsburgh

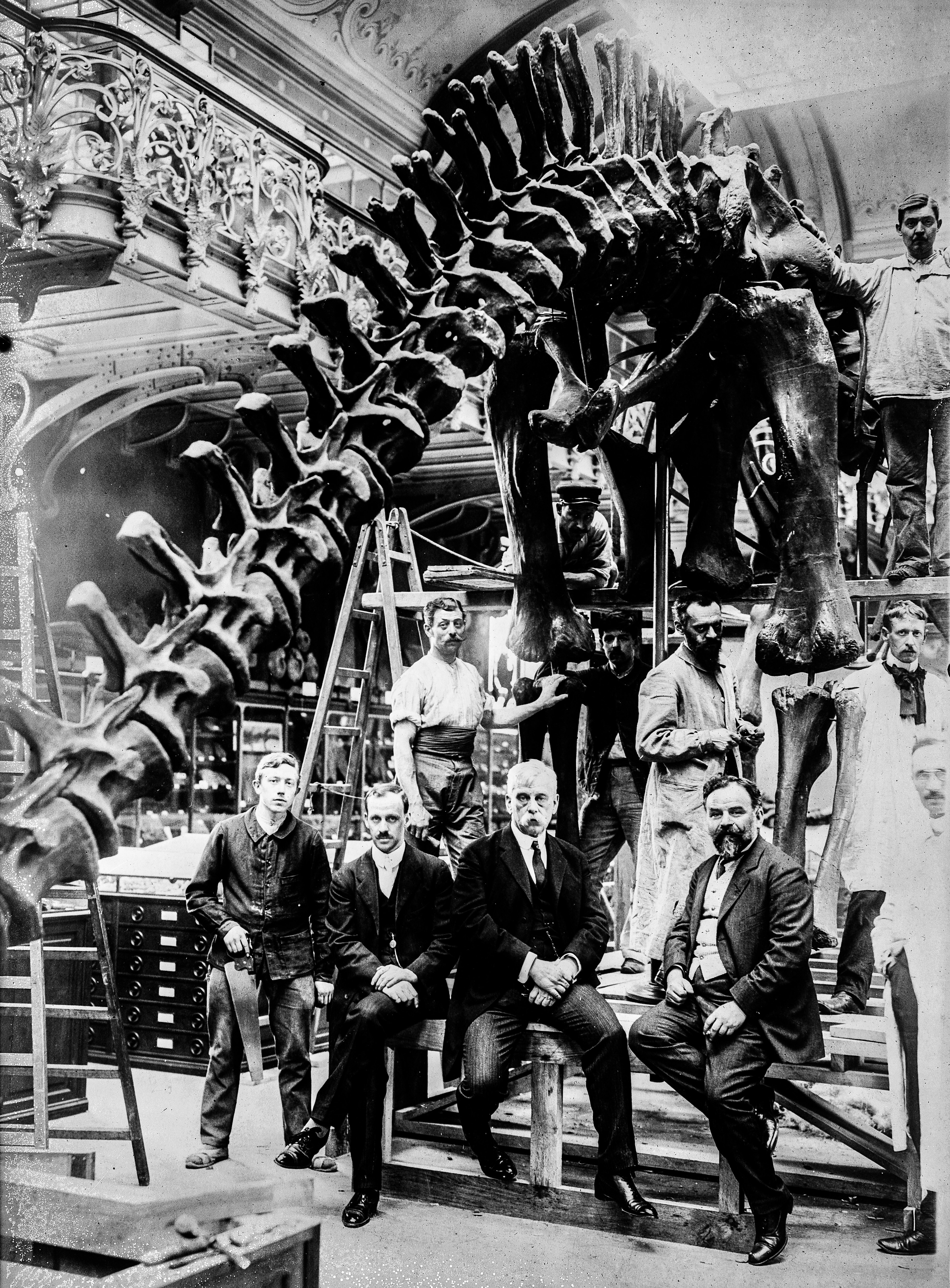
1908 work on the cast of Dippy in Paris; Arthur Goggeshall and William Holland at front center

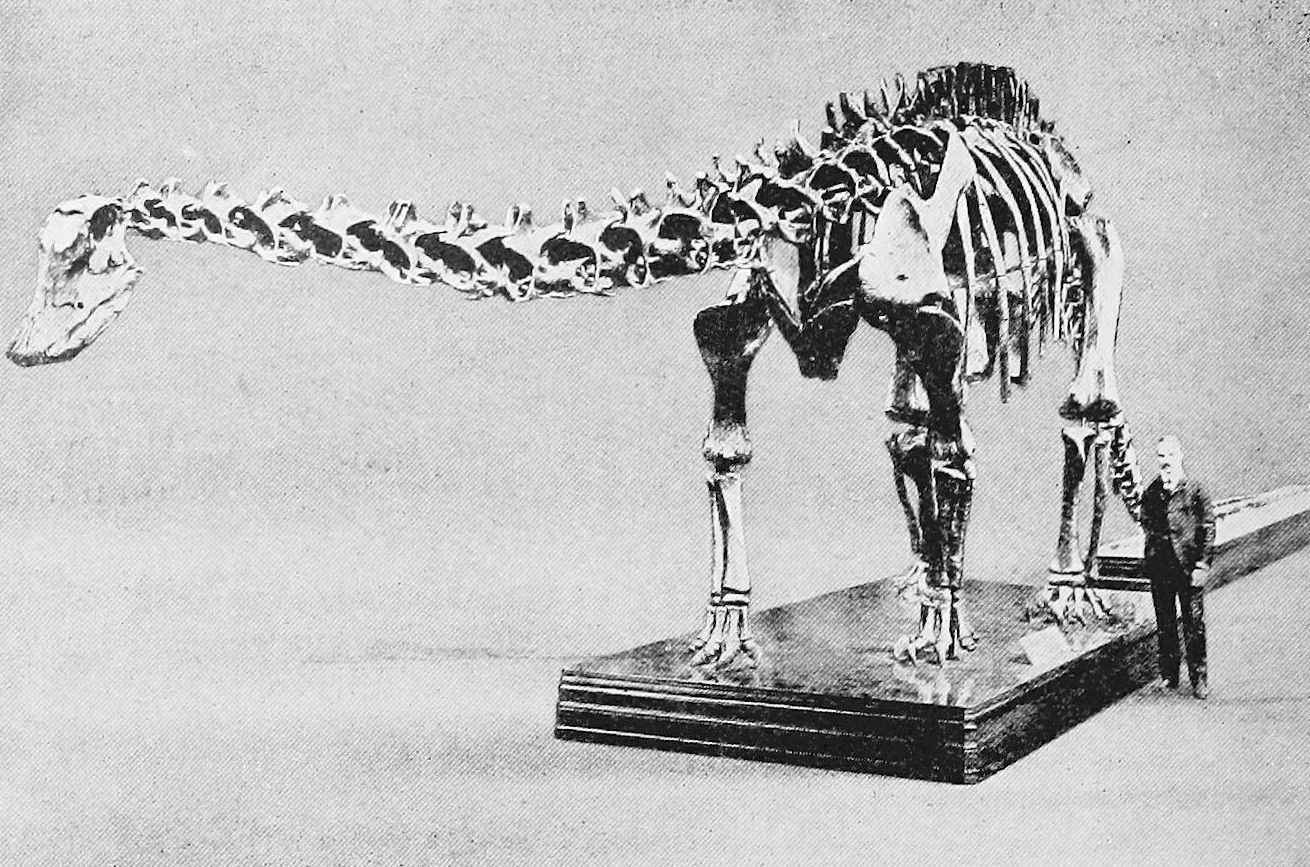
1922 image from H. G. Wells's A Short History of the World

== See also ==
- Gordo (dinosaur)
- Sophie the Stegosaurus
- Sue (dinosaur)
- Archie (squid)

== Bibliography ==
=== Editio princeps ===
- Diplodocus Marsh: Its Osteology, Taxonomy, and Probable Habits, with a Restoration of the Skeleton, 1901

=== Secondary sources ===
- Ilja Nieuwland (April 30, 2019). American Dinosaur Abroad: A Cultural History of Carnegie's Plaster Diplodocus. University of PITTSBURGH Press. ISBN 978-0-8229-4557-4.
- Rea, Tom (April 1, 2004). Bone Wars: The Excavation and Celebrity of Andrew Carnegie's Dinosaur. University of Pittsburgh Pre. ISBN 978-0-8229-7258-7.
- Lowell Dingus (December 4, 2018). King of the Dinosaur Hunters: The Life of John Bell Hatcher and the Discoveries that Shaped Paleontology. Pegasus Books. ISBN 978-1-68177-930-0.
- Brezinski, D. K., & Kollar, A. D. (2008), Geology of the Carnegie Museum dinosaur quarry site of Diplodocus carnegii, Sheep Creek, Wyoming. Annals of Carnegie Museum, 77(2), 243–252.
- Ulrich Merkl (November 25, 2015). Dinomania: The Lost Art of Winsor McCay, The Secret Origins of King Kong, and the Urge to Destroy New York. Fantagraphics Books. ISBN 978-1-60699-840-3.
- Breithaupt, Brent H, The discovery and loss of the “colossal” Brontosaurus giganteus from the fossil fields of Wyoming (USA) and the events that led to the discovery of Diplodocus carnegii: the first mounted dinosaur on the Iberian Peninsula, VI Jornadas Internacionales sobre Paleontología de Dinosaurios y su Entorno, September 5–7, 2013, pp. 48–50
- Moore, Randy (July 23, 2014). Dinosaurs by the Decades: A Chronology of the Dinosaur in Science and Popular Culture: A Chronology of the Dinosaur in Science and Popular Culture. ABC-CLIO. ISBN 978-0-313-39365-5.
