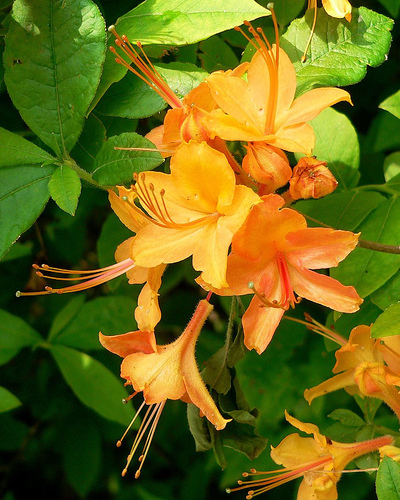
- At Craggy Gardens, North Carolina

Conservation status
- Secure (NatureServe)

Scientific classification
- Kingdom: Plantae
- Clade: Tracheophytes
- Clade: Angiosperms
- Clade: Eudicots
- Clade: Asterids
- Order: Ericales
- Family: Ericaceae
- Genus: Rhododendron
- Subgenus: Rhododendron subg. Hymenanthes
- Section: Rhododendron sect. Pentanthera
- Species: R. calendulaceum

Binomial name
- Rhododendron calendulaceum (Michx.) Torr.

Synonyms
- Synonymy: Azalea calendulacea Michx.; Azalea pontica var. calendulacea (Michx.) Pers.; Azalea aurantiaca F.Dietr.; Azalea calendulacea var. crocea Michx.; Azalea coccinea aurantia Lodd.; Azalea crocea (Michx.) Hoffmanns.; Azalea jammea Pritz.; Azalea nudiflora var. aurantiaca (F.Dietr.) Dum.Cours.; Azalea nudiflora var. coccinea-major Dum.Cours.; Azalea nudiflora var. hirta Elliott; Azalea speciosa var. aurantia (Lodd.) DC.; Azalea speciosa var. aurantiaca (F.Dietr.) G.Kirchn.; Rhododendron calendulaceum f. aurantiacum (F.Dietr.) Zabel; Rhododendron calendulaceum f. aurantium (Lodd.) Rehder; Rhododendron calendulaceum f. croceum (Michx.) Rehder; Rhododendron calendulaceum var. croceum (Michx.) Sweet; Rhododendron luteum C.K.Schneid.; Rhododendron luteum var. croceum (Michx.) C.K.Schneid.; Rhododendron speciosum var. aurantium (Lodd.) Sweet

= Rhododendron calendulaceum =

Flame azalea

Species of plant

Rhododendron calendulaceum, the flame azalea, is a species of Rhododendron. It is a deciduous shrub that grows up to 120–450 cm tall. This species of Rhododendron is native to the Appalachian Mountains in the eastern United States, ranging from southern Pennsylvania and Ohio to northern Georgia. It may be extirpated from Pennsylvania and Alabama. It occurs naturally in mixed deciduous forests and is typically found in woodland slopes and mountain balds in the Appalachians, where it prefers dry and rocky mountain woods. The inflorescences of Rhododendron calendulaceum are visited by many animals such as bees, butterflies, hummingbirds and small mammals. It is a popular cultivated plant due to its bright yellow, orange or red flowers.

== Description ==
It is a deciduous shrub, 120–450 cm tall. The leaves are simple, 3–7 cm long, slightly dull green above and villous below. The arrangement is generally alternate, however they appear whorled towards the tips of the branches.

The flowers are 4–5 cm long, usually bright orange, but can vary from pastel orange to dark reddish-orange. These non-fragrant flowers have 4-5 lobes and grow in clusters of 5–10. It typically blooms in late May and early June.

=== Variation in wild populations ===
Rhododendron calendulaceum is a highly variable species. The flowers of Rhododendron calendulaceum can range from light yellow to orange and rarely, a scarlet red. Some flowers appear to be a blend of multiple colors, and others seem to have secondary pigments such as pink or red. Some have even reported a white flower in Rhododendron calendulaceum, however these records cannot be verified. The buds of Rhododendron calendulaceum are typically a darker color than the mature flower, however some flowers deepen in color with age. In some plants, a full range of colors such as yellows, oranges and reds can be present on the same plant. It is possible that color change is affected by light, with flowers in shadier areas exhibiting less color change compared to plants in open spaces.

The flower sizes in Rhododendron calendulaceum are also variable, with a typical flower size of 2-2.5 inches. Some flowers have blossoms of less than an inch, while others can be up to 3 inches.

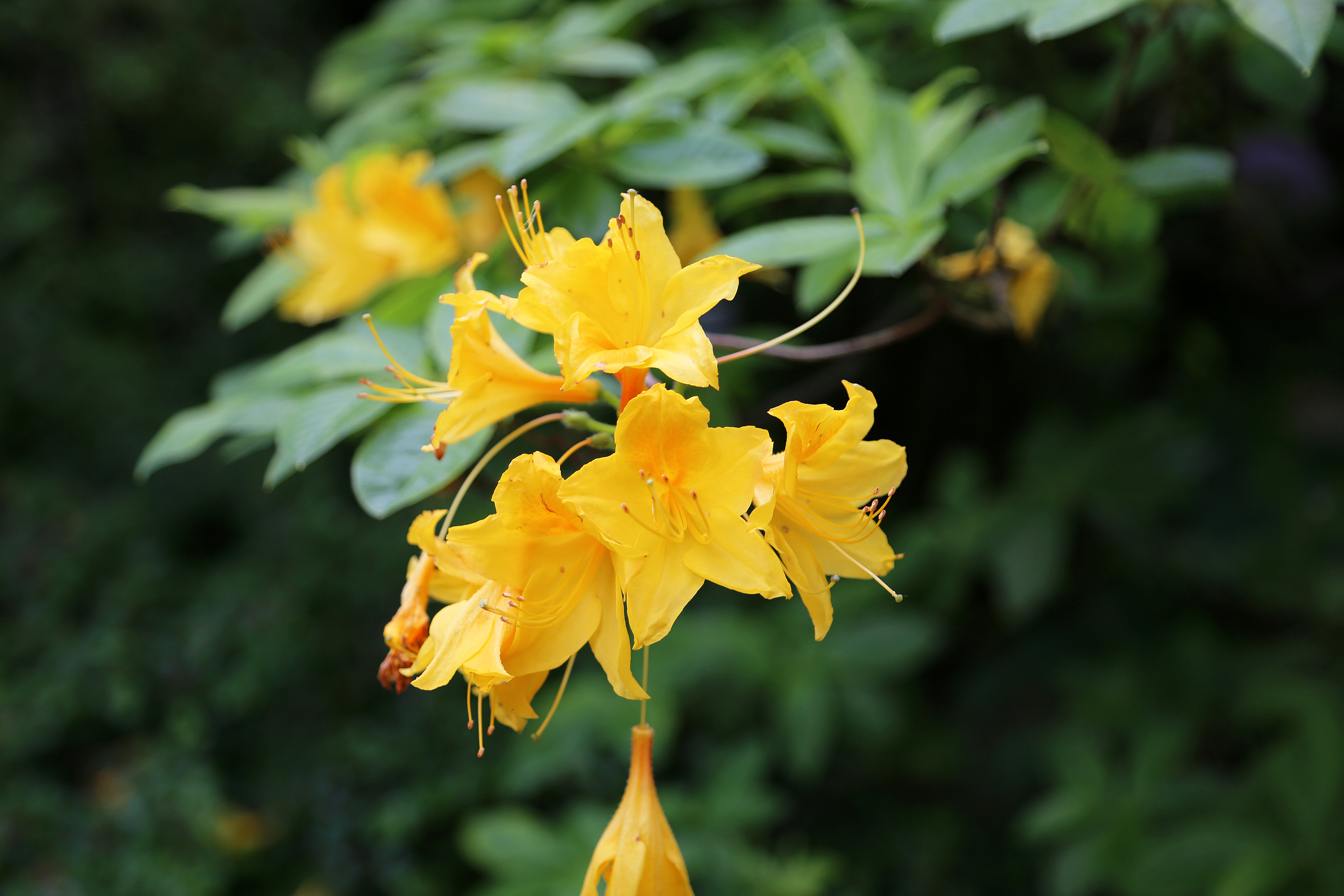
Yellow flowers

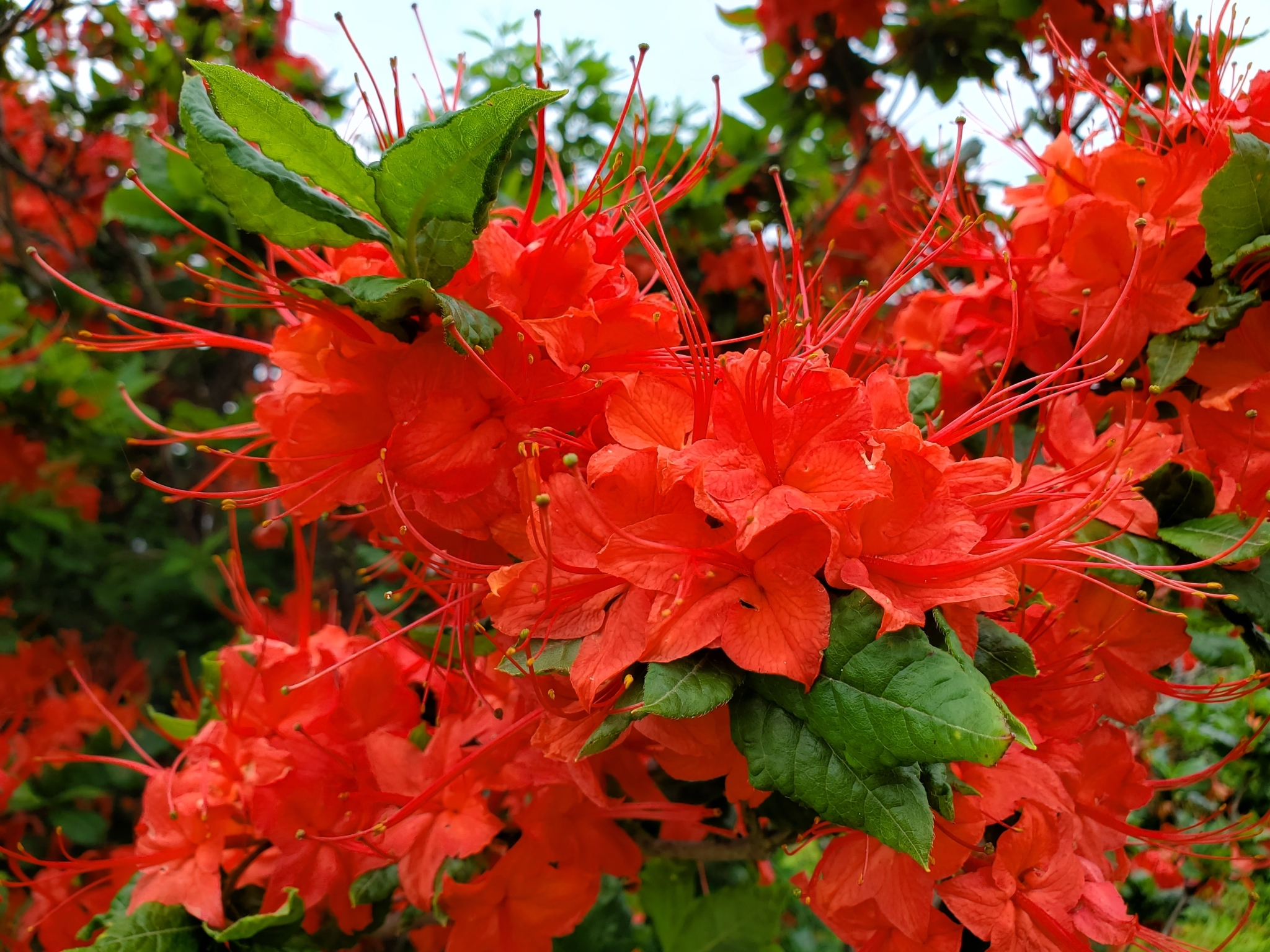
Deep orange flowers

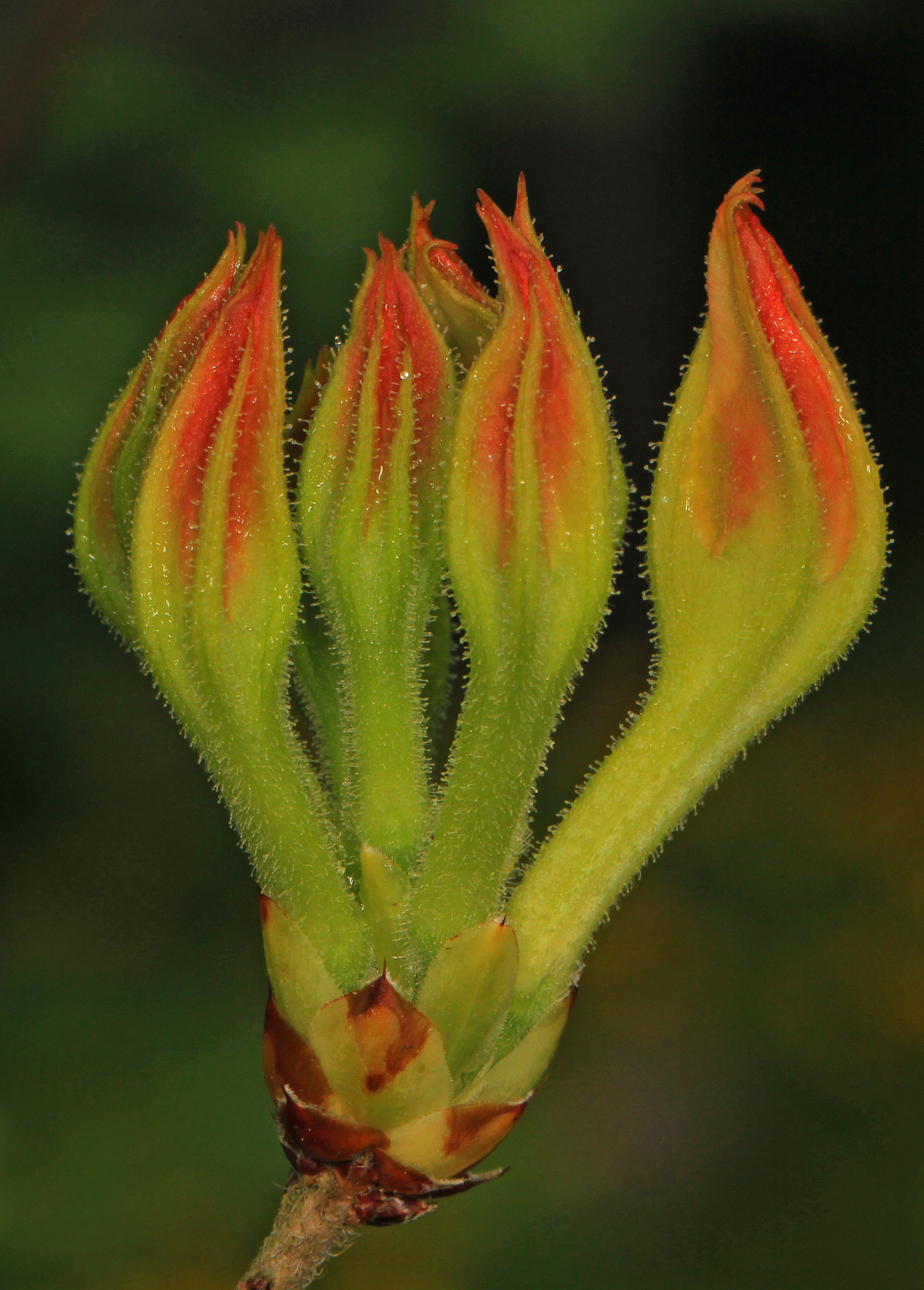
Flower buds

== Ecology ==
The inflorescences of Rhododendron calendulaceum are visited by a diverse group of animals such as bees, butterflies, hummingbirds and small mammals. The flowers can only be pollinated by the wings of butterflies. Only Papilio glaucus and Speyeria cybele have been observed pollinating the flowers. P. glaucus is more effective in pollination due to differences in wing flapping behavior. Rhododendron calendulaceum is a host of the fungus Exobasidium vaccinii. E. vaccinii negatively affects the reproduction and health of the flowers and branches of Rhododendron calendulaceum. The insect Rhinocapsus vanduzeei is known to feed on the stamens of Rhododendron calendulaceum flowers. Rhododendron calendulaceum is a host plant for the larvae of Euura lipovskyi.

== Distribution and habitat ==
This species of Rhododendron is native to the Appalachian Mountains in the eastern United States, ranging from southern Pennsylvania and Ohio to northern Georgia. It may be extirpated from Pennsylvania and Alabama. The state of Pennsylvania lists Rhododendron calendulaceum as extirpated from the state. It has been reported historically in New York and Maryland, however, its current native status in these states is undetermined. However, it can occur as an introduced species in anthropogenic habitats. It occurs naturally in mixed deciduous forests. It is typically found in woodland slopes and mountain balds in the Appalachians, where it prefers dry and rocky mountain woods. It lives in a variety of forest ecosystems such as Loblolly-shortleaf pine, oak-hickory and maple-beech-birch forests. It prefers to be covered by Quercus montana, Quercus alba, Quercus velutina and Quercus rubra. Rhododendron calendulaceum primarily occurs in mixed deciduous forests. It is found in the well-developed shrub layer of oaks with southern and western sun exposure. It is commonly found in ravines with mesic soil. Rhododendron calendulaceum is an important understory shrub in forests that were formerly co-dominated by the American chestnut. Rhododendron calendulaceum commonly occurs with other ericaceous shrubs including Rhododendron maximum, Kalmia latifolia, Vaccinium corymbosum, and Gaylussacia spp. Rhododendron calendulaceum commonly occurs in oak forest that periodically see fire. Rhododendron calendulaceum grows in well-drained, mesic to moist, medium to fine textured soils in part shade. Rhododendron calendulaceum prefers a pH range of 4.3 to 5.8. Rhododendron calendulaceum requires a minimum soil depth of 14 in. Rhododendron calendulaceum requires at least a 200 day growing season.

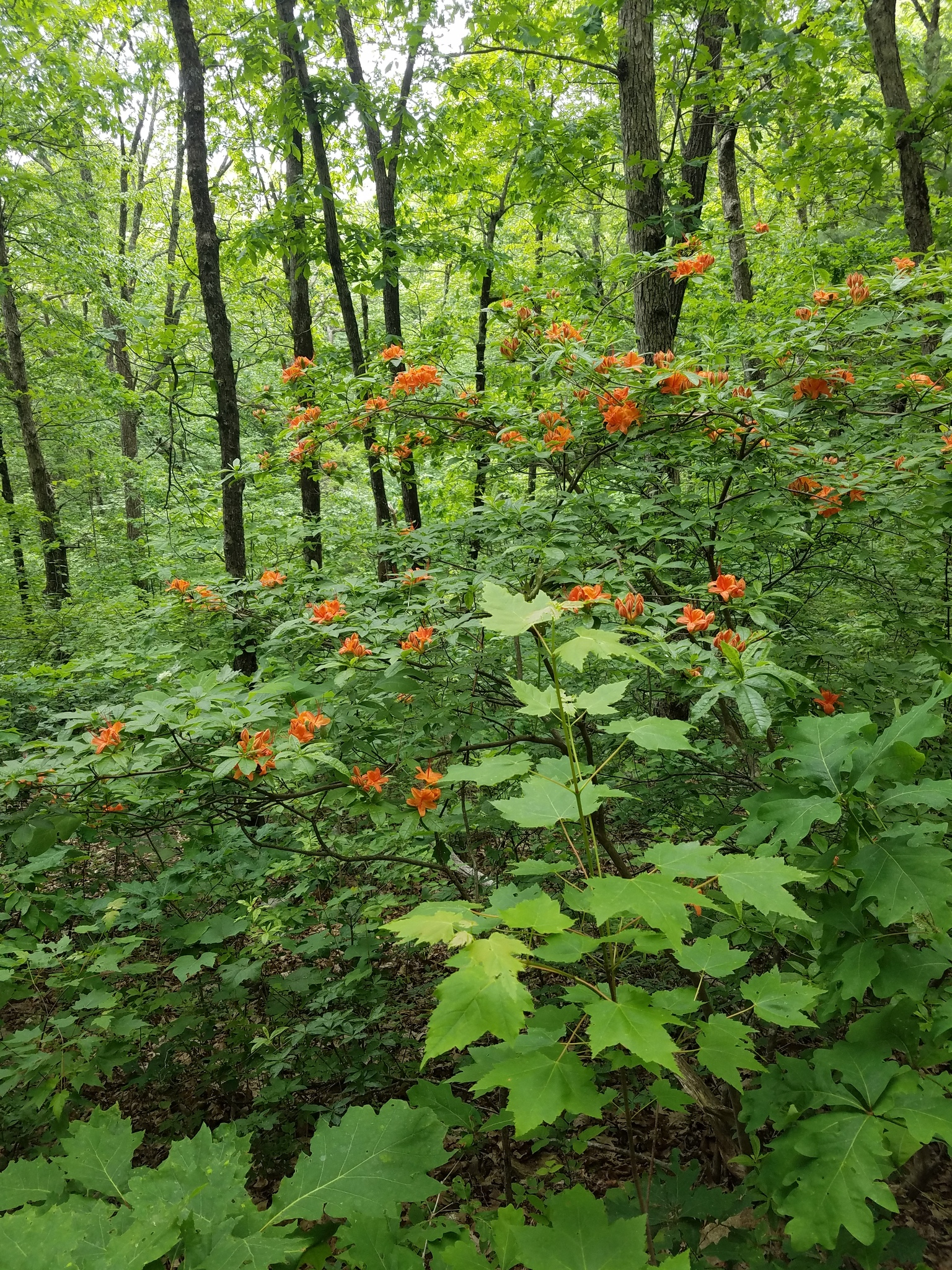
Rhododendron calendulaceum in the shrub layer under oaks

== Horticulture ==
The flame azalea is a popular cultivated plant, primarily due to its showy flowers. Many cultivars and domestic varieties exist, including Chattooga, Cherokee, Golden Sunset Flame, Golden Yellow Flame, Smokey Mountaineer and Wahsega. It is also an important parent species in hybrid Azaleas, such as Ghent, Knap Hill, Maid in the Shade, Mollis and Northern Lights.

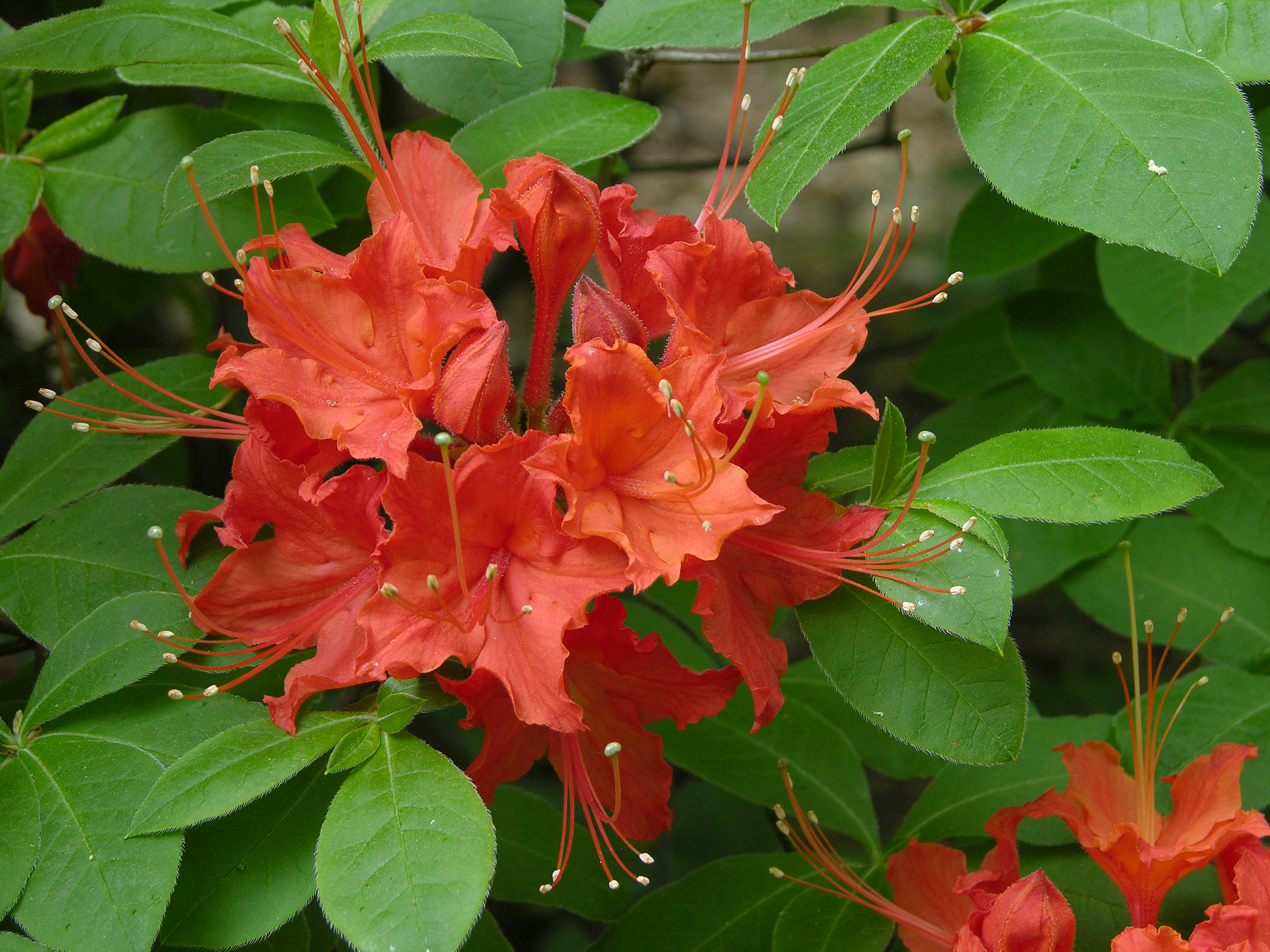
'Mandarin Red' cultivar

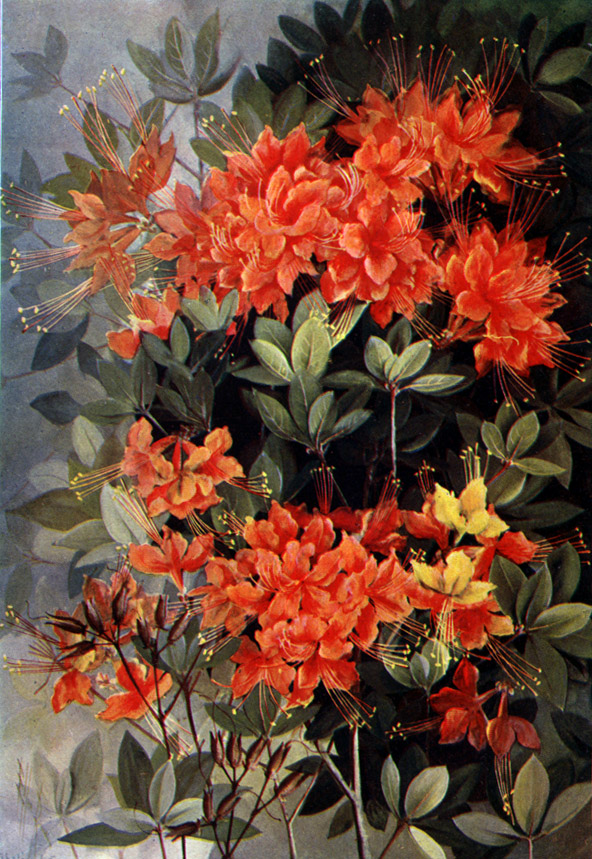

== See also ==
- Central and southern Appalachian montane oak forest
