= Catawbiense hybrid =

Flowering plant hybrid

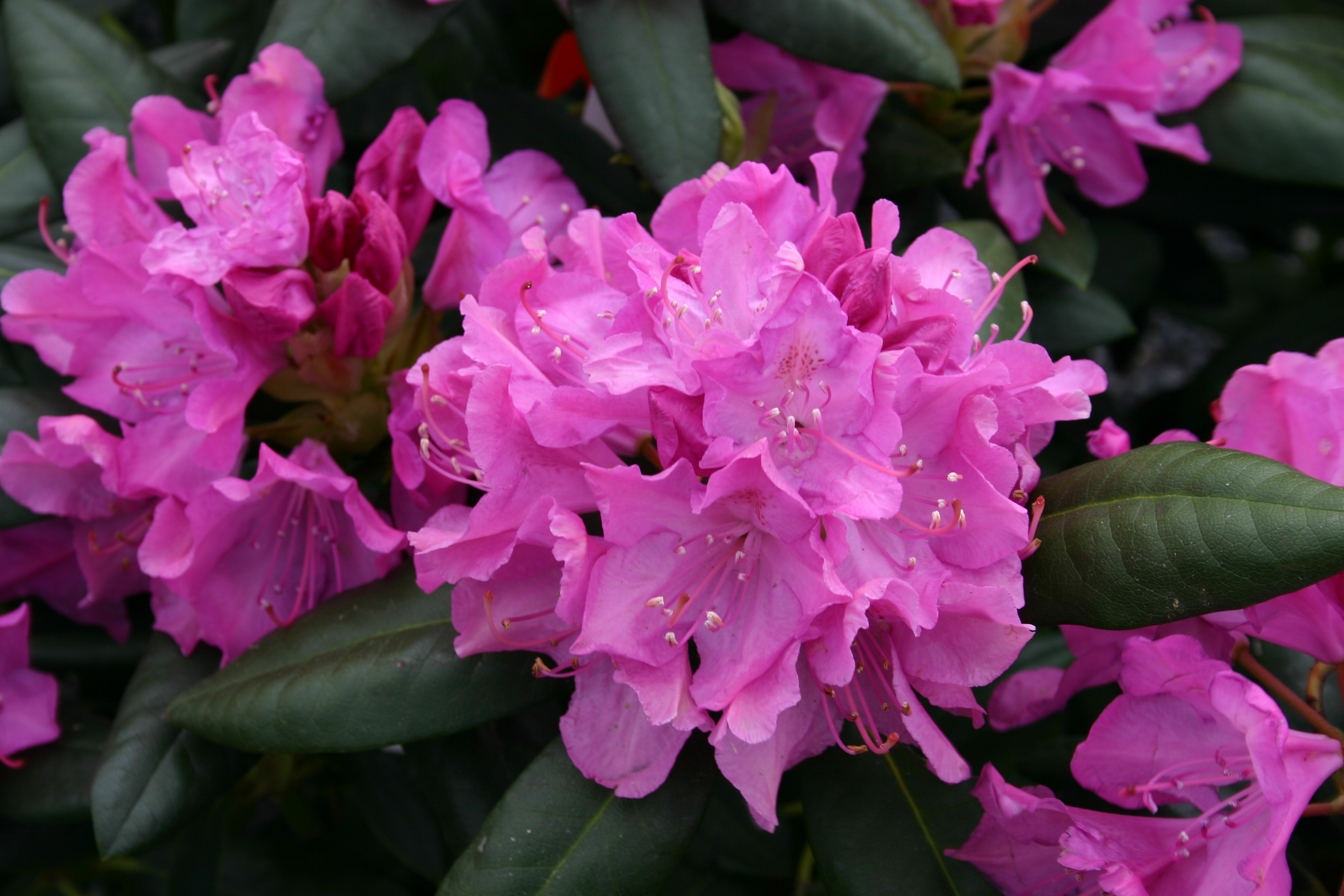
Rhododendron 'Roseum Elegans' is a catawbiense hybrid

A catawbiense hybrid is a hybrid of the plant genus Rhododendron, derived from crosses of American species Rhododendron catawbiense and Rhododendron maximum with European and Asian species R. arboreum, R. caucasicum and R. ponticum.

== See also ==
- List of Rhododendron species
