= Central and southern Appalachian montane oak forest =

Type of forest

The Central and southern Appalachian montane oak forest is a forest system found in the Appalachian Mountains of West Virginia, Virginia, Kentucky, Tennessee, North Carolina, South Carolina, and Georgia.

These forests occur on exposed sites such as ridge crests and south- to west-facing slopes, typically from about 3,000 to 4,500 feet (910 to 1,370 m) elevation, but sometimes extending to 5,500 feet (1,700 m). Soils are thin, weathered, nutrient-poor, low in organic matter, and acidic. Trees are often stunted and wind-flagged.

== Flora ==
The Central and southern Appalachian montane oak forest commonly includes: the Northern red oak (Quercus rubra), white oak (Quercus alba), and sprouts of American chestnut (Castanea dentata).

Common shrubs include: Winterberry (Ilex montana), flame azalea (Rhododendron calendulaceum), catawba rhododendron (Rhododendron catawbiense), and great rhododendron (Rhododendron maximum).

== See also ==
- Appalachian temperate rainforest
- Southern Appalachian spruce–fir forest
