= Rhododendron arboreum =

- R. arboreum subsp. arboreum in central Nepal

Conservation status
- Least Concern (IUCN 3.1)

Scientific classification
- Kingdom: Plantae
- Clade: Tracheophytes
- Clade: Angiosperms
- Clade: Eudicots
- Clade: Asterids
- Order: Ericales
- Family: Ericaceae
- Genus: Rhododendron
- Species: R. arboreum

Binomial name
- Rhododendron arboreum Sm.

Species of flowering plant

Rhododendron arboreum, the tree rhododendron, is an evergreen shrub or small tree with a showy display of bright red flowers. It is found in Bhutan, China, India, Myanmar, Nepal, Sri Lanka, Pakistan and Thailand. It is the national flower of Nepal.

== Description ==
Its specific epithet means "tending to be woody or growing in a tree-like form". It has been recorded as reaching heights of 20 m (66 ft), though it is more usually 12 m (39 ft) tall and broad. This plant holds the Guinness Record for the World's Largest Rhododendron. The tree discovered in 1993 at Mount Japfü in the Kohima District of Nagaland, India, holds the Guinness Record for the tallest Rhododendron at 20 m (65 ft). In sharp contrast to this, the New Guinean epiphytic species Rhododendron caespitosum never exceeds 10 cm (4 in) in height.

In early and mid spring, trusses of 15–20 bell-shaped flowers, 5 cm (2 in) wide and 3–5 cm (1–2 in) long are produced; they are red, pink or white, with black nectar pouches and black spots inside.

== Taxonomy ==
=== Subspecies ===
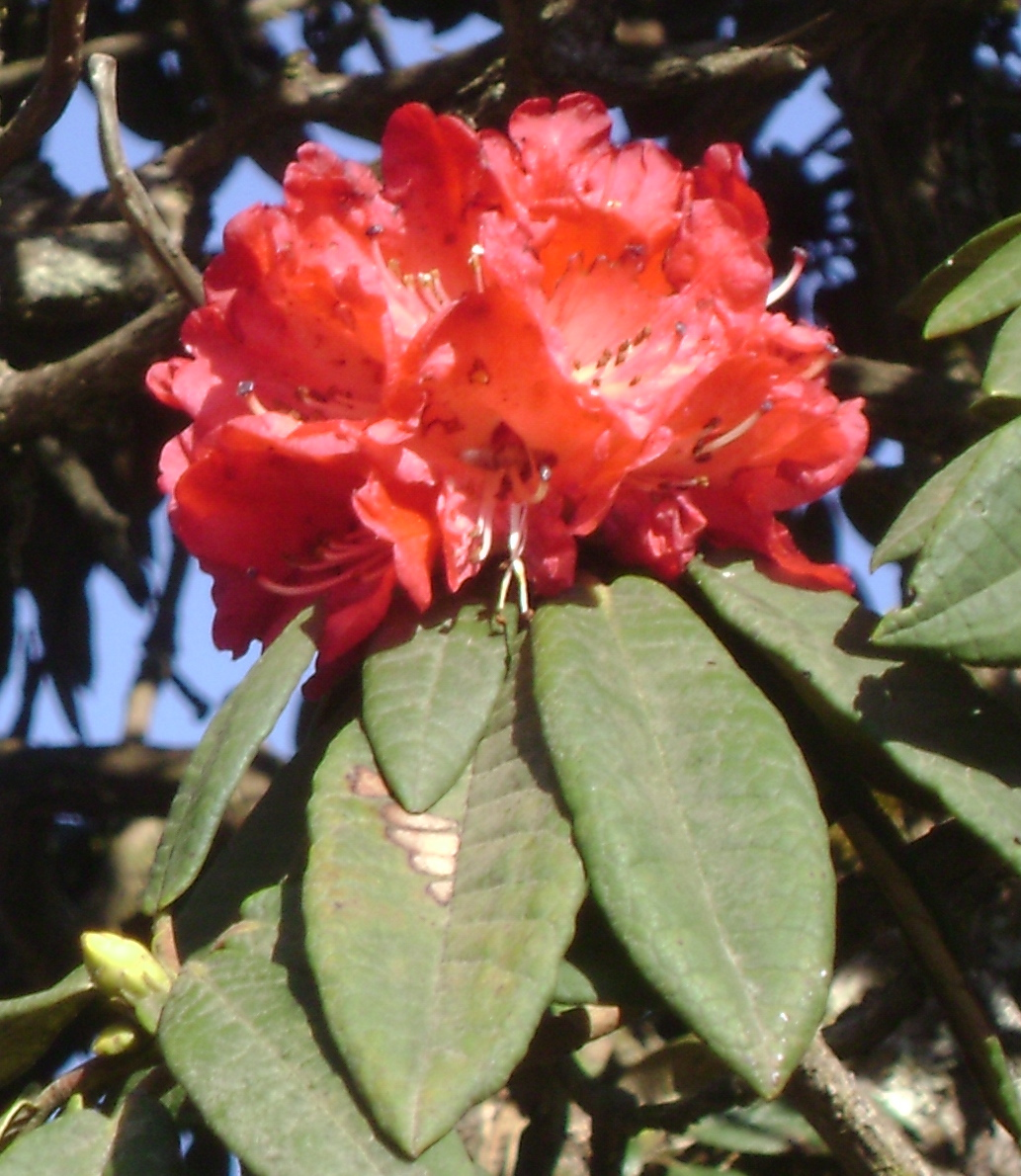
Rhododendron arboreum subsp. nilagiricum, Mukurthi National Park, Tamil Nadu

The Plants of the World Online database accepts five subspecies:

- Rhododendron arboreum subsp. albotomentosum (Davidian) D.F.Chamb. has leaves with whitish hairs beneath; it occurs in Myanmar.
- Rhododendron arboreum subsp. arboreum, occurring in the Himalaya.
- Rhododendron arboreum subsp. cinnamomeum (Wall. ex G.Don) Tagg has leaves with cinnamon-brown hairs beneath; it occurs in the central & eastern Himalaya to southern Tibet.
- Rhododendron arboreum subsp. nilagiricum (Zenker) Tagg is found in the Nilgiri Mountains in Tamil Nadu, India.
- Rhododendron arboreum subsp. zeylanicum (T.J.Booth) Tagg; a rare subspecies endemic in the highlands of Sri Lanka, named after Zeilan, the name used by Arabian traders to refer to Sri Lanka

== Habitat ==
Rhododendron arboreum is found in the Pakistan, India, Nepal, Myanmar, Sri Lanka, the Himalayas, Northeast India, and Tibet. It is introduced in Madeira.

It is the national flower of Nepal. In India it is the state tree of Uttarakhand and state flower of Nagaland. It is the provincial flower of Sri Lanka's Central Province.

== Cultivation ==
Rhododendron arboreum prefers moist but well-drained, leafy, humus-rich, acid pH soil, in dappled shade. It has broad, dark green leaves, 7–19 cm (3–7.5 in) long, with a silvery, fawn or brown hairy coating beneath.

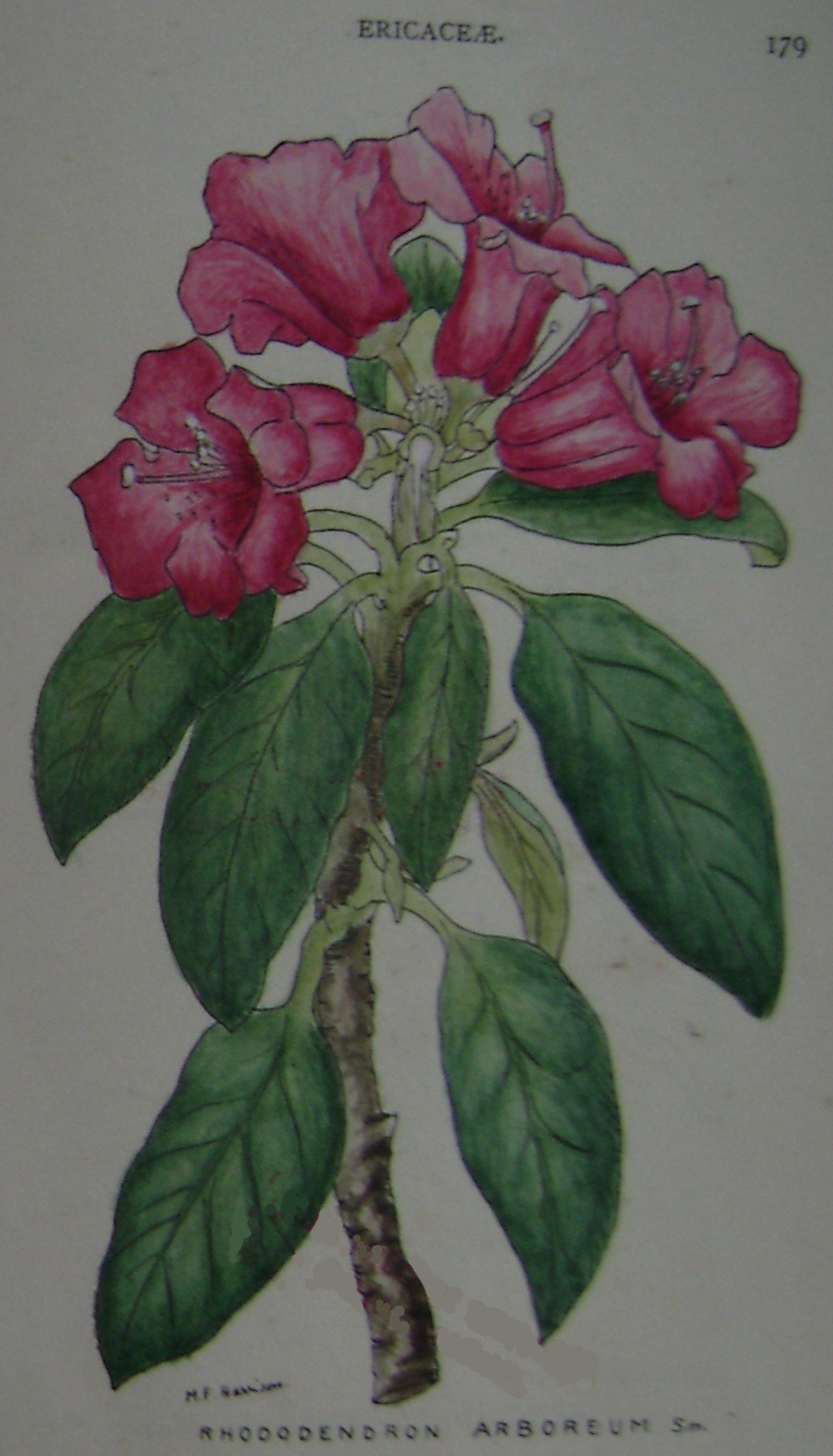
Rhododendron arboreum from Fyson

This plant is suitable for woodland gardens.

Shelter is imperative to prevent wind damage to leaves.

== Threats ==
Rhododendrons are susceptible to vine weevil, rhododendron and azalea whiteflies, leafhoppers, lacebugs, scale insects, caterpillars, aphids, powdery mildew, bud blast, honey fungus, rust, leafy gall, petal blight, silver leaf, phytophthora root rot and lime-induced chlorosis.

== See also ==
- Catawbiense hybrid – hybrid with R. arboreum
