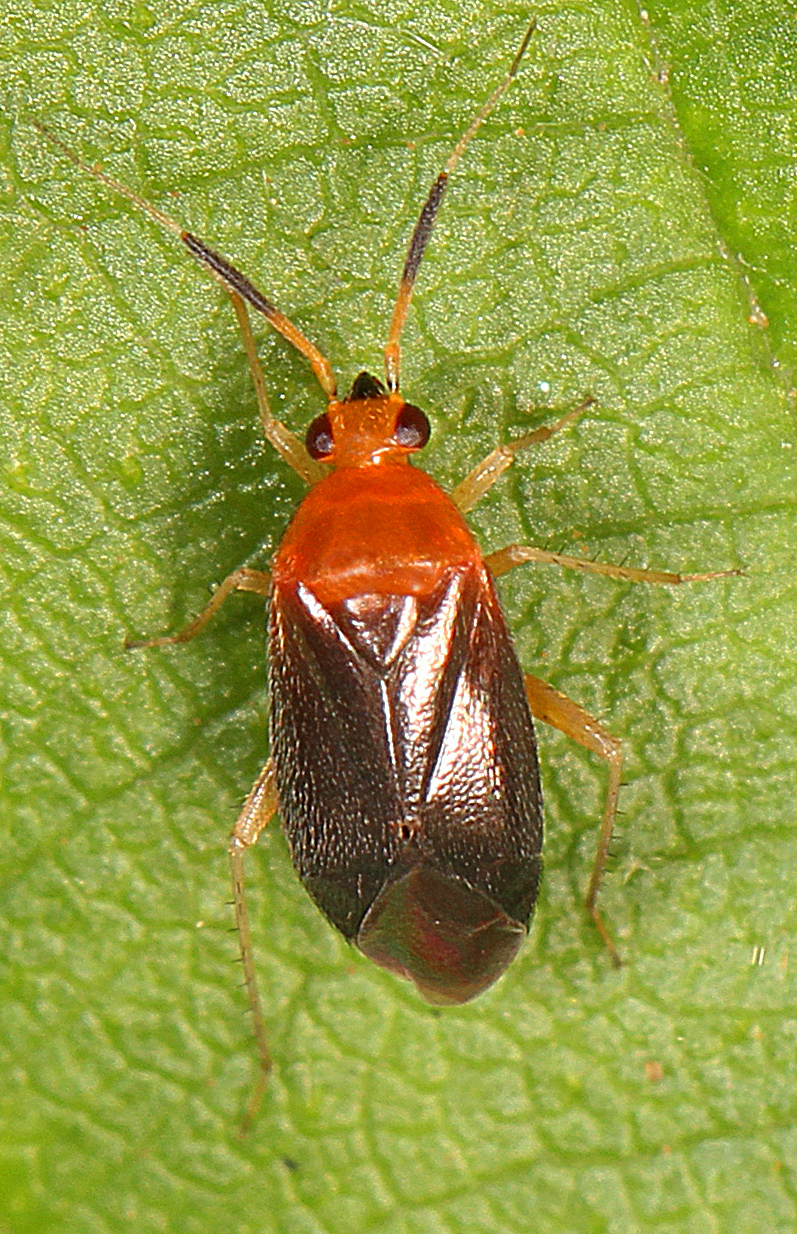
- Rhinocapsus vanduzeei

Scientific classification
- Kingdom: Animalia
- Phylum: Arthropoda
- Clade: Pancrustacea
- Class: Insecta
- Order: Hemiptera
- Suborder: Heteroptera
- Family: Miridae
- Subfamily: Phylinae
- Tribe: Phylini
- Genus: Rhinocapsus; Uhler, 1890

= Rhinocapsus =

Genus of true bugs

Rhinocapsus is a genus of North American plant bugs in the family Miridae. There are at least two described species in Rhinocapsus.

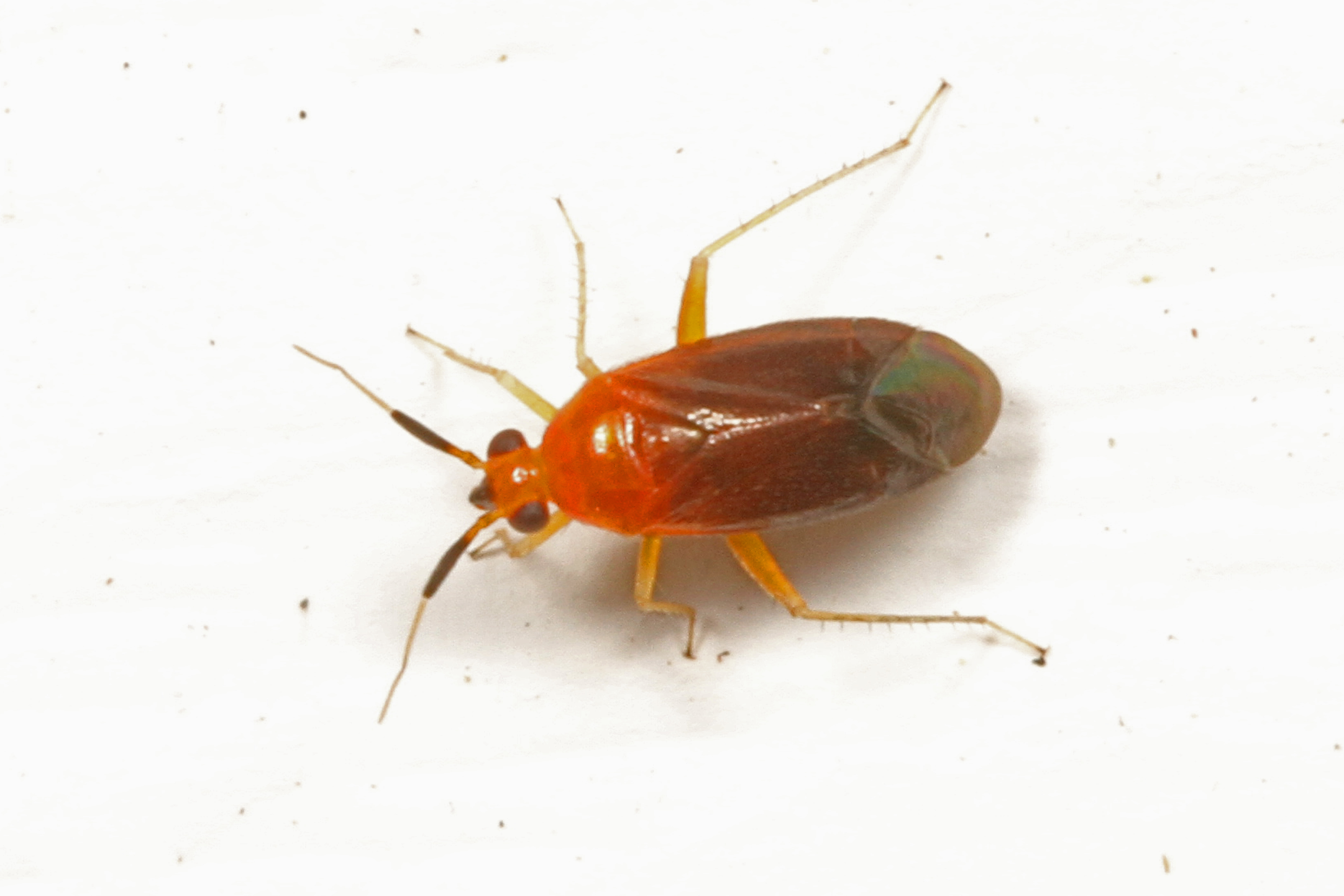
Rhinocapsus vanduzeei

== Species ==
These two species belong to the genus Rhinocapsus:

- Rhinocapsus rubricans (Provancher, 1887)
- Rhinocapsus vanduzeei Uhler, 1890 (azalea plant bug)
