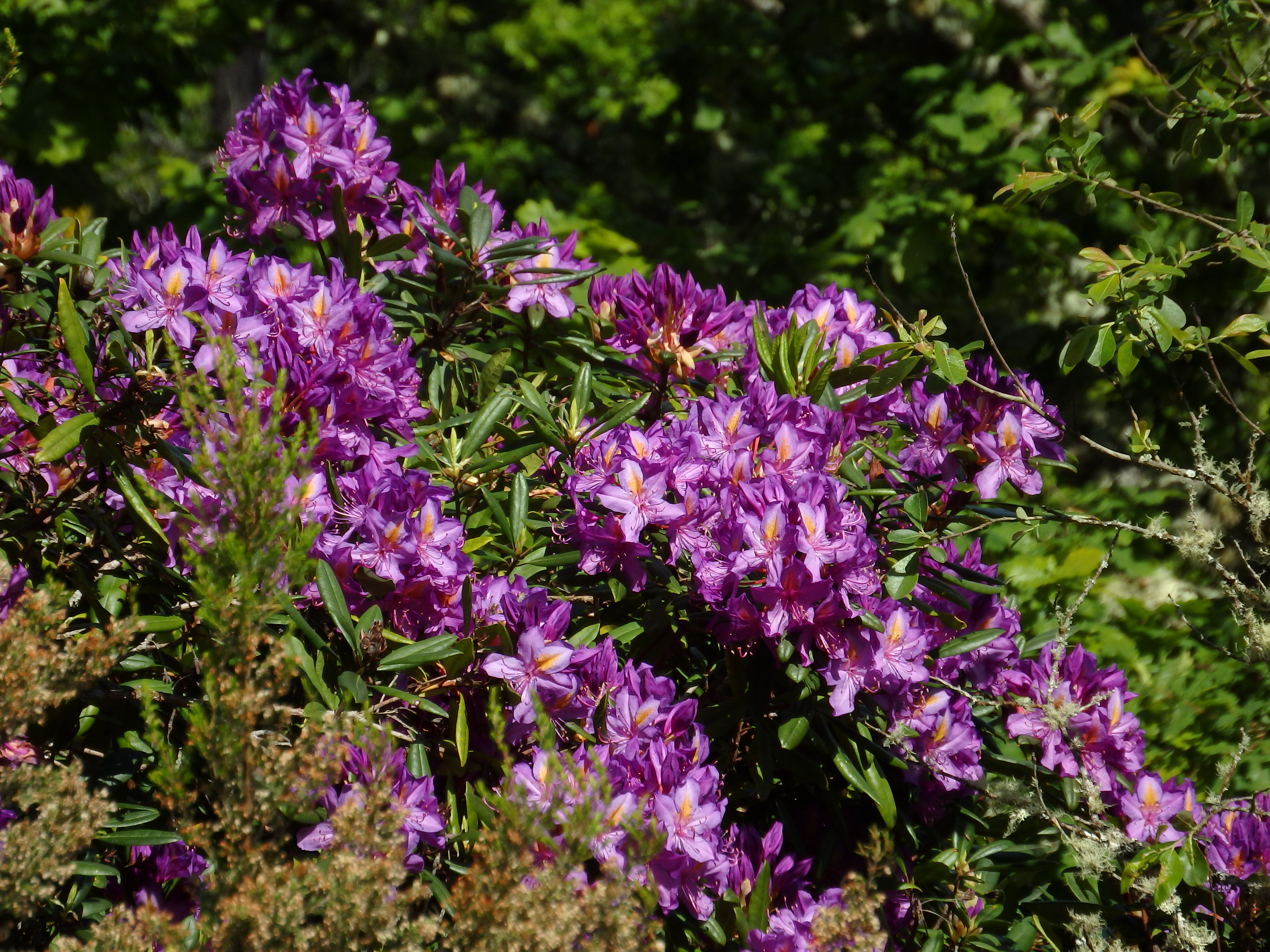

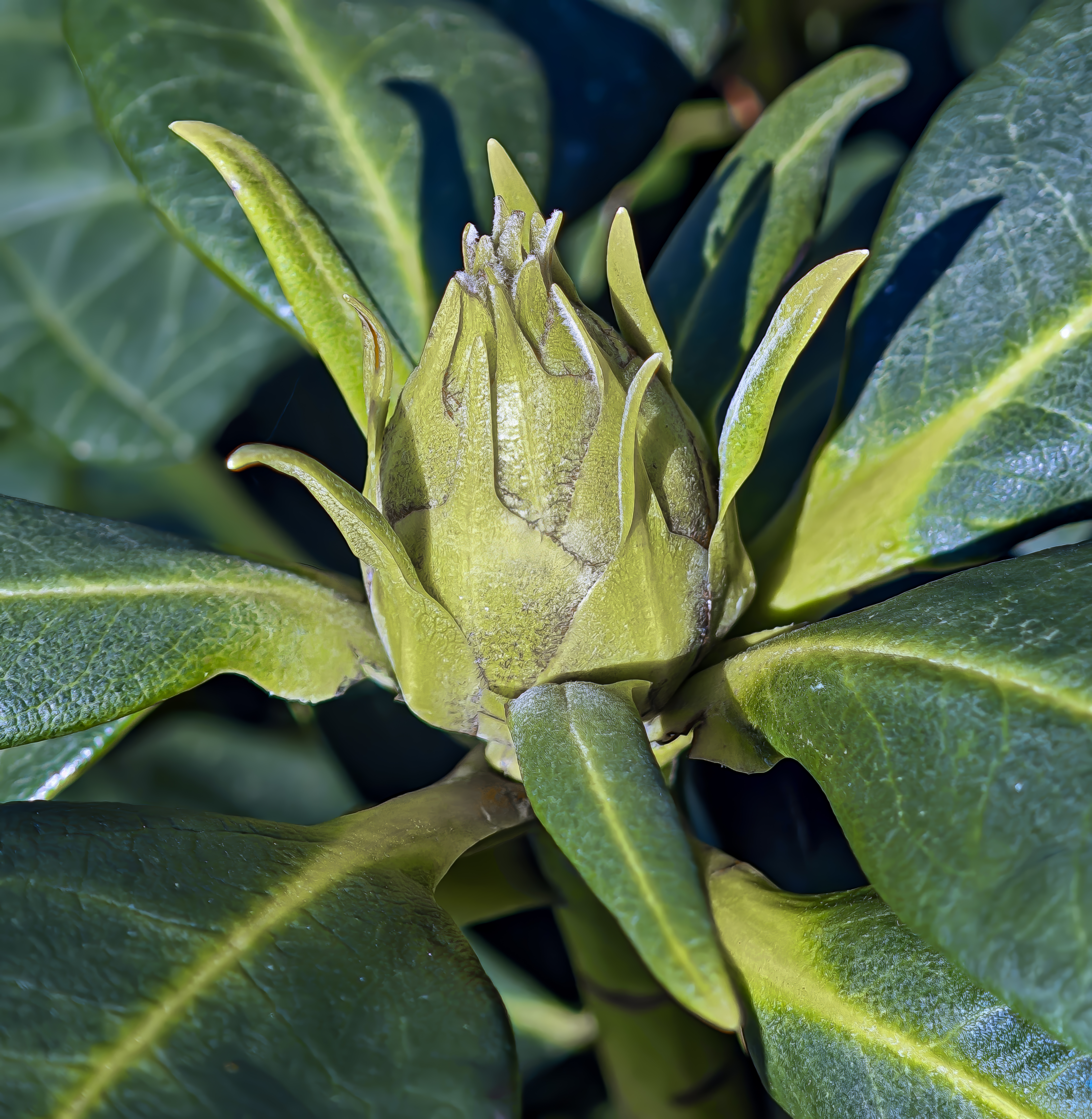

Scientific classification
- Kingdom: Plantae
- Clade: Tracheophytes
- Clade: Angiosperms
- Clade: Eudicots
- Clade: Asterids
- Order: Ericales
- Family: Ericaceae
- Genus: Rhododendron
- Species: R. ponticum

Binomial name
- Rhododendron ponticum L.

Synonyms
- List: Azalea arborea L.; Azalea lancifolia (Moench) Kuntze; Hymenanthes pontica (L.) H.F.Copel.; Rhododendron adansonii E.-A.Baumann; Rhododendron catesbaei J.Forbes; Rhododendron catesbaeum Dum.Cours.; Rhododendron deciduum Andrews ex Steud.; Rhododendron hyacinthiflorum Steud.; Rhododendron lancifolium Moench; Rhododendron lowei Loudon; Rhododendron obtusum P.Watson; Rhododendron odoratum Lodd. ex Steud.; Rhododendron ponticum f. angustilobum Rukhadze & Pachulia; Rhododendron ponticum f. aurantiacomaculatum Rukhadze & Pachulia; Rhododendron ponticum f. brachystamineum Rukhadze & Pachulia; Rhododendron ponticum f. crispatum Rukhadze & Pachulia; Rhododendron ponticum f. luteomaculatum Rukhadze & Pachulia; Rhododendron ponticum var. obtusum (P.Watson) G.Don; Rhododendron ponticum f. parviflorum Rukhadze & Pachulia; Rhododendron speciosum Salisb.

= Rhododendron ponticum =

Species of flowering plant in the heath family

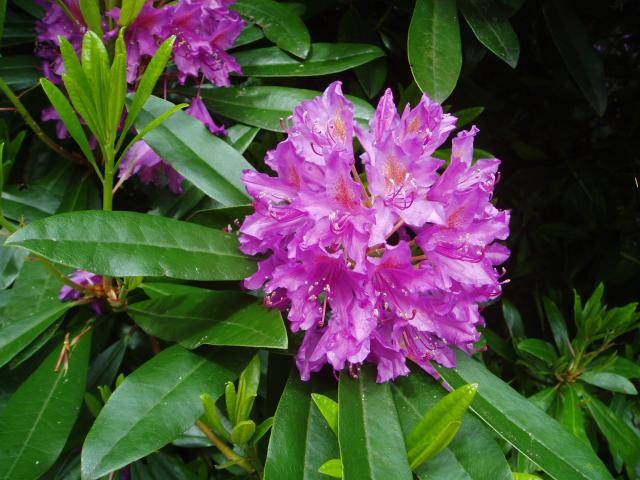
R. ponticum inflorescence

Rhododendron ponticum, called common rhododendron or pontic rhododendron, is a species of flowering plant in the heath family Ericaceae. It is native to the Iberian Peninsula in southwest Europe and the Caucasus region in northern West Asia.

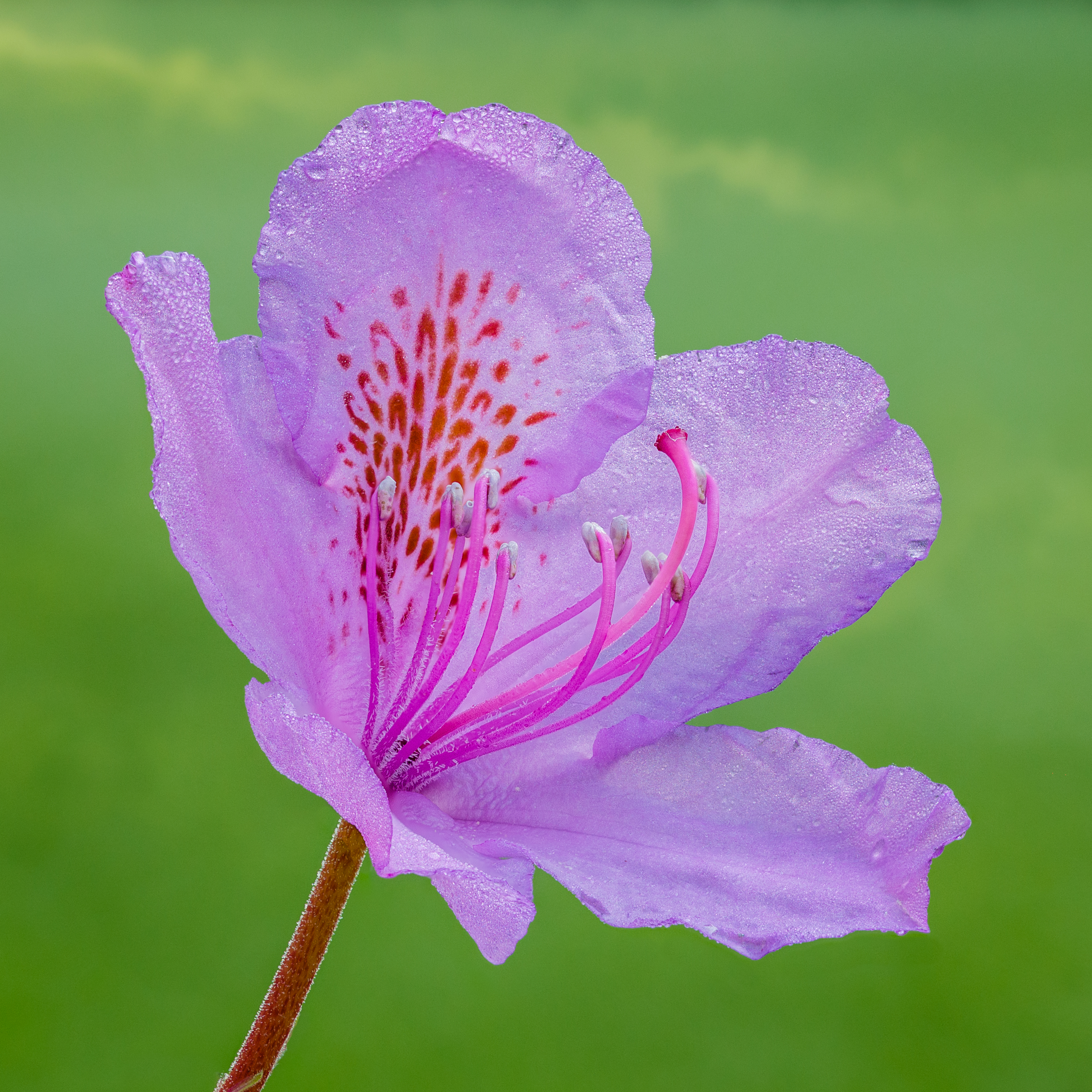
Flower of Rhododendron ponticum

== Description ==
R. ponticum is a dense, suckering shrub or small tree growing to 5 m (16 ft) tall, rarely 8 m (26 ft). The leaves are evergreen, 6 to 18 cm (2.4 to 7.1 in) long and 2 to 5 cm (0.79 to 1.97 in) wide. The flowers are 3.5 to 5 cm (1.4 to 2.0 in) in diameter, violet-purple, often with small greenish-yellow spots or streaks. The fruit is a dry capsule 1.5 to 2.5 cm (0.59 to 0.98 in) long, containing numerous small seeds.

It has two subspecies:

Image	Name	Distribution
	R. p. baeticum (Boiss. & Reut.) Hand.-Mazz.	Found in central and southern Portugal and southern Spain (in the Province of Cádiz).
	R. p. ponticum	Found around the southern Black Sea Basin (eastern Bulgaria, northern Turkey, Georgia, Northern Caucasus) and central Lebanon.

And a variegated variety:

- R. p. var. heterophyllum R. Ansin – Found in Turkey.

== Distribution and habitat ==
The species has two disjunct populations, one in the southwestern Iberian Peninsula (central and southern Portugal and southwestern Spain) and the other near the southern Black Sea Basin (eastern Bulgaria, northern Turkey, Georgia, and Northern Caucasus). It has also been introduced to Madeira, Myanmar, Belgium, the British Isles, Netherlands and France.

In the Iberian Peninsula, the range is limited to the montane environments of the Caramulo mountains, the Monchique range and the Aljibe range. These are remnants of the original laurissilva forests that covered the peninsula 66 million years ago.

Though the common rhododendron was present in Great Britain prior to the most recent ice age, it did not recolonise afterwards, meaning that the modern ecology of the island developed without it. Its presence today in Great Britain is due to human introduction, and it can easily become established and cause problems in some situations, often smothering entire hillsides (especially in Snowdonia and western Scotland). In the British Isles, it colonises moorlands, uplands and shady woodlands (alongside escaped laurels and the native holly), as well as areas with acidic soils.

=== Historical range ===
Fossil evidence shows it had a much wider range across most of southern and western Europe before the Late Glacial Maximum, or until about 20,000 years ago.

The plant was noted by the botanist Joseph Pitton de Tournefort during his travels in the Near East in 1700–1702. It was named by Linnaeus to commemorate the ancient kingdom of Pontus on the southern shores of the Black Sea where it grew. At the other end of its range, in southern Spain, Linnaeus' friend and correspondent Clas Alströmer found it growing alongside oleander. It was introduced to Britain as an ornamental shrub in 1763 and was later planted to provide cover for game birds. It is now considered to be an invasive species.

== Cultivation and uses ==
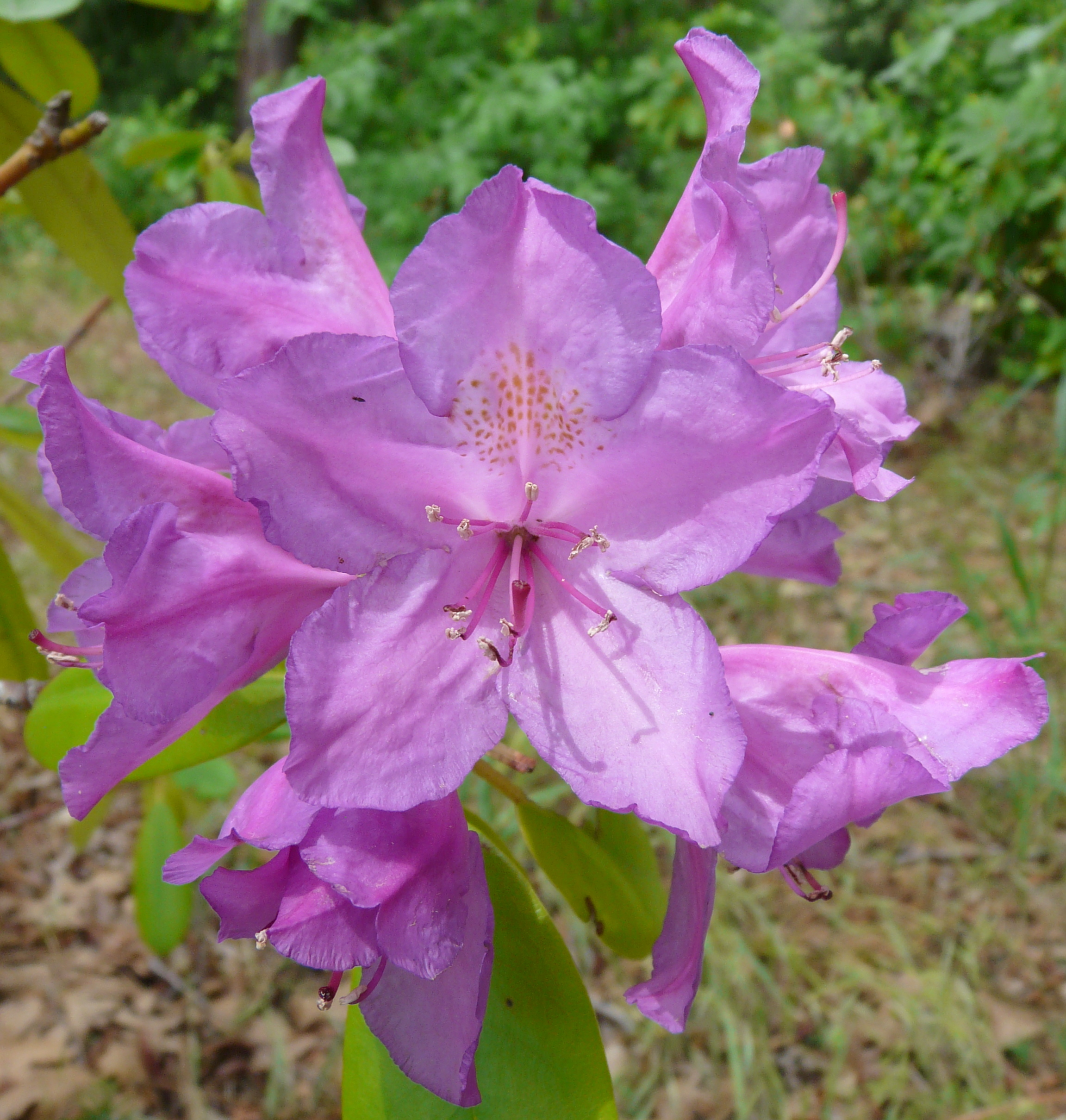
Closeup of Rhododendron ponticum

Rhododendron ponticum subsp. baeticum is one of the most extensively cultivated rhododendrons in western and central Europe. It is used as an ornamental plant in its own right and, more frequently, as a rootstock onto which other more attractive rhododendrons are grafted. The plants were first cultivated in Britain in the 1760s, supplied by Conrad Loddiges, and became widely distributed through the commercial nursery trade in the late 18th and early 19th centuries. The roots readily produce suckers below the graft, which can sometimes overtake the intended grafted rhododendron.

Honey produced with pollen from the flowers of this plant can be poisonous if consumed in sufficient quantities, causing severe hypotension and bradycardia in humans. It is known as mad honey due to its toxic diterpenes (grayanotoxins). This poisonous honey plays a significant part in the 2023 film A Haunting in Venice.

The sap from a freshly cut branch can be used to treat toothache.

== Invasive species ==
Suckering of the root, together with its abundant seed production, has led to it becoming an invasive species over much of western Europe and in parts of New Zealand. Rhododendron control is a key element in nature conservation in those areas. Conservation organisations in Britain now believe R. ponticum has become "a severe problem" in the native Atlantic oakwoods of the west highlands of Scotland and in Wales and Ireland, and on heathlands in southern England, crowding out the native flora. Clearance strategies have been developed, including the flailing and cutting down of plants with follow-up herbicide spraying. Injection of herbicide into individual plants has been found to be more precise and effective.

In Ireland, particularly in the Killarney National Park it is extremely invasive and the exact date that Rhododendrons were introduced is unknown. It has no natural predators in Ireland and is avoided by grazing animals as the stems and leaves contain toxic levels of grayanotoxins. It is suggested that the shrub was planted in Derrycunihy wood in the 19th century or before.

A study in the journal Functional Ecology also showed that invasive rhododendron nectar was toxic to European honeybees (Apis mellifera), killing individuals within hours of consumption. It also paralyzed bees of the species Andrena carantonica, a solitary mining bee. Bees became paralysed and exhibited excessive grooming or other distress behaviours after feeding on Rhododendron nectar, and ate less food than bees fed a control nectar. In contrast the buff-tailed bumblebee (Bombus terrestris) was not affected by the rhododendron nectar. It is important not to see Rhododendron as a problem species for honey bees as they actually avoid the flowers owing to their ability to detect the toxin nectar. The toxicity is caused by grayanotoxin 1 which is one of several highly hydroxylated diterpenoid defence chemicals produced in the leaves of Rhododendron to protect against herbivores – e.g. the Thrips Heliothrips haemorrhoidalis. Some species of honey bee (Apis mellifera sub spp caucasica) tolerate the toxin and make so-called "mad honey".

=== Identification difficulties ===
Recent efforts to control the spread of Rhododendron ponticum in the United Kingdom have led to controversy, particularly at Taymouth Castle in Highland Perthshire. The accurate identification of the plant remains a topic of debate, particularly where it is interspersed amongst clumps of cherry laurel (Prunus laurocerasus) in areas of mixed woodland. Tensions surrounding the management of these cohabiting species came to a head in early December 2022, when prominent arboriculturalists encountered strong opposition from machine operators on the estate regarding the correct identification and subsequent management of the plant. This culminated in the destruction of a large laurel thicket. While the similarities and differences between the plants remains a subject of debate, cherry laurel may indeed be viewed and treated in the same way as rhododendron in this habitat niche.

== See also ==
- Catawbiense hybrid – hybrid with R. ponticum
