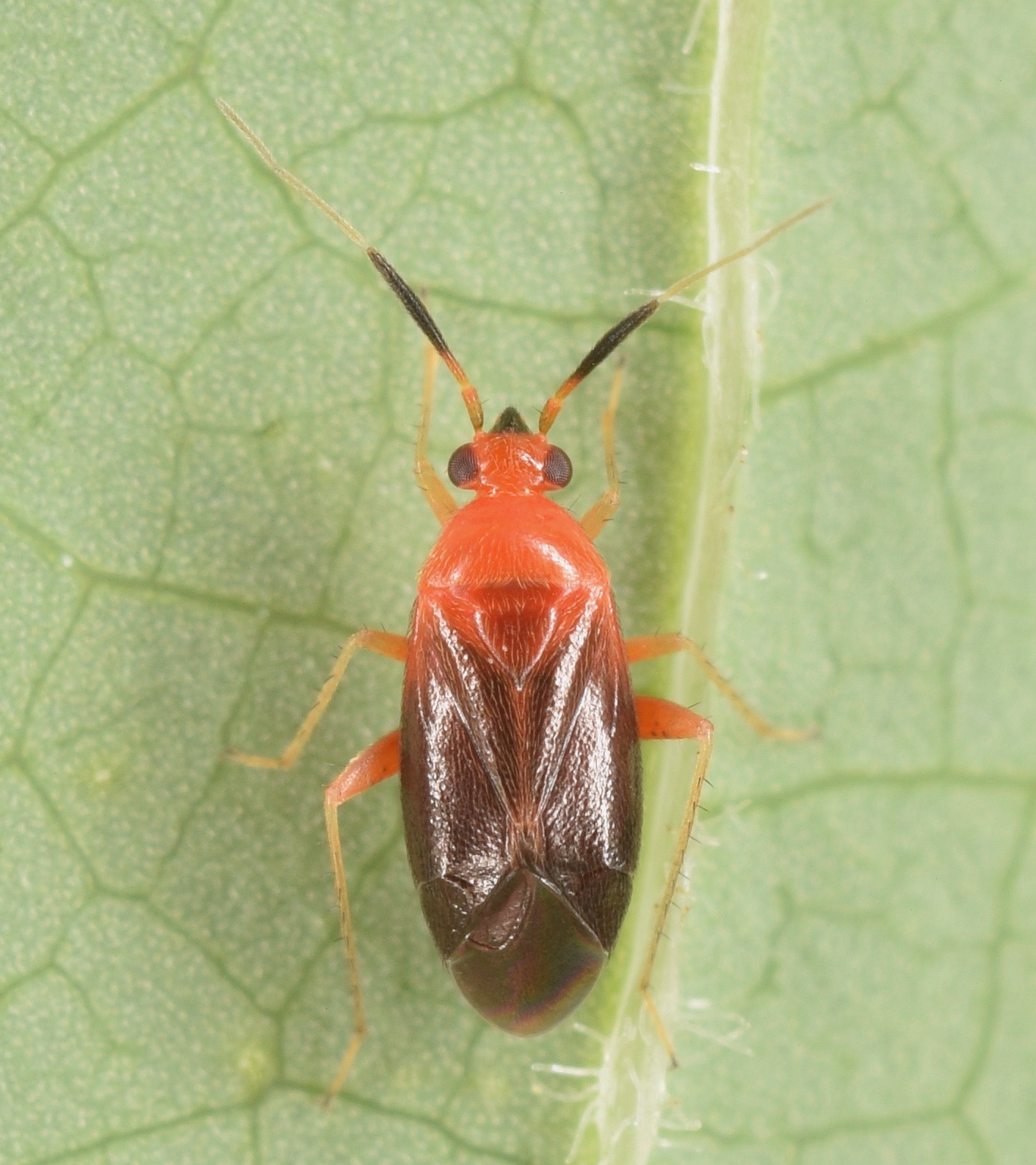

Scientific classification
- Kingdom: Animalia
- Phylum: Arthropoda
- Class: Insecta
- Order: Hemiptera
- Suborder: Heteroptera
- Family: Miridae
- Subfamily: Phylinae
- Tribe: Phylini
- Genus: Rhinocapsus
- Species: R. rubricans

Binomial name
- Rhinocapsus rubricans (Provancher, 1887)

= Rhinocapsus rubricans =

Species of true bug

Rhinocapsus rubricans is a species of plant bug in the family Miridae. It is found in North America.
