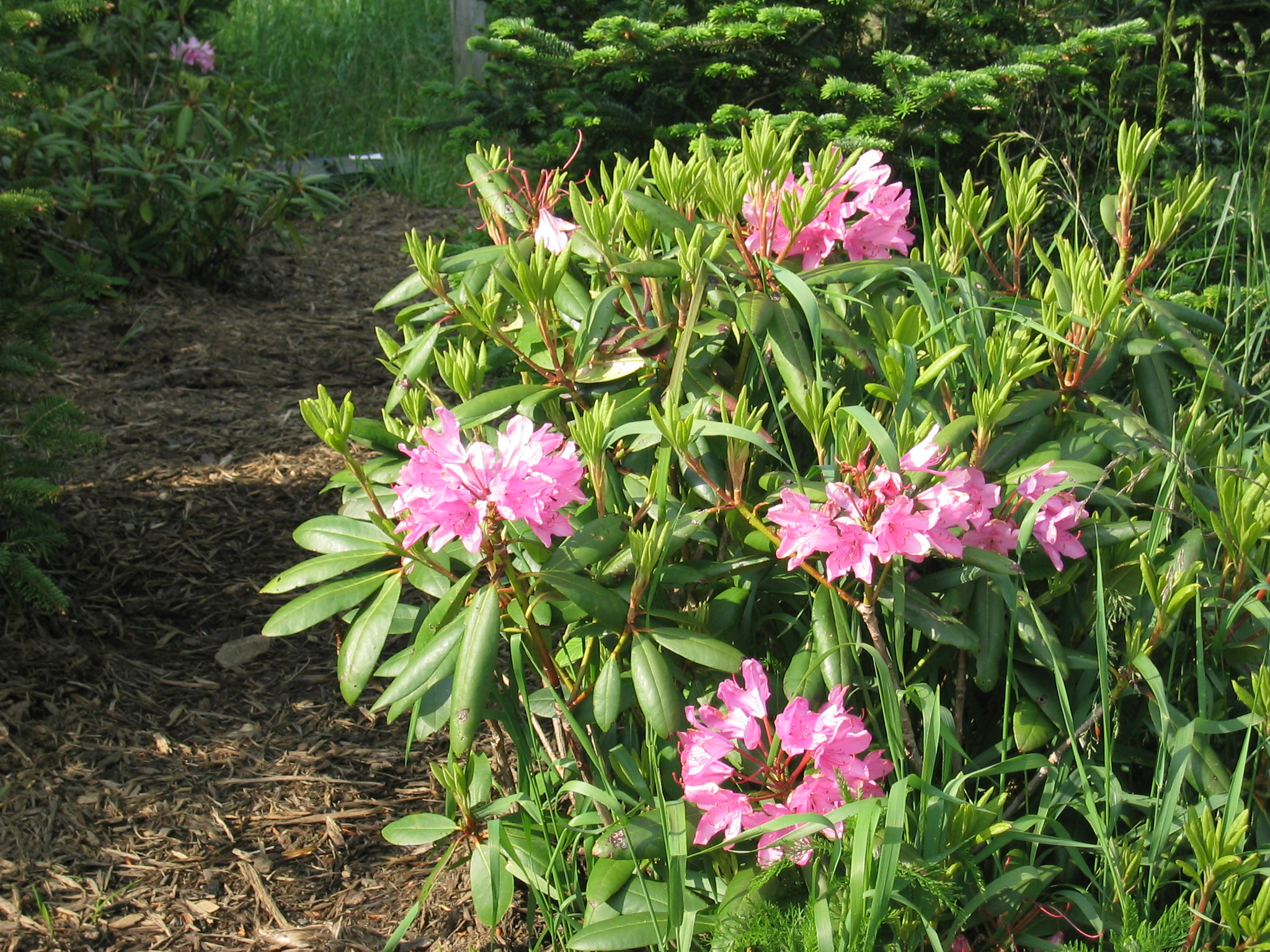
- Rhododendron catawbiense growing wild on Mount Mitchell, North Carolina

Conservation status
- Least Concern (IUCN 3.1)

Scientific classification
- Kingdom: Plantae
- Clade: Embryophytes
- Clade: Tracheophytes
- Clade: Angiosperms
- Clade: Eudicots
- Clade: Asterids
- Order: Ericales
- Family: Ericaceae
- Genus: Rhododendron
- Species: R. catawbiense

Binomial name
- Rhododendron catawbiense Michx.
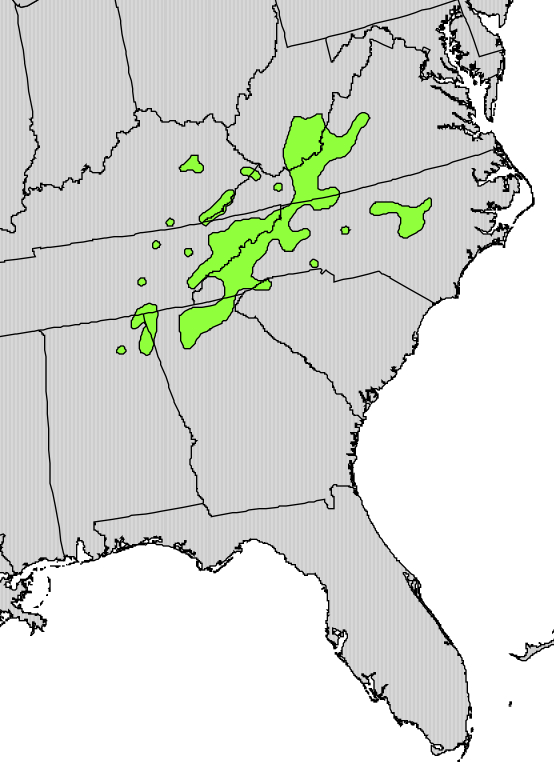
- Natural range

= Rhododendron catawbiense =

Species of plant

Rhododendron catawbiense, with common names Catawba rosebay, Catawba rhododendron, mountain rosebay, purple ivy, purple laurel, purple rhododendron, red laurel, rosebay, rosebay laurel, is a species of Rhododendron native to the eastern United States, growing mainly in the southern Appalachian Mountains from West Virginia south to northern Alabama.

It is a dense, suckering shrub growing to 3 m (9.8 ft) tall, rarely 5 m (16 ft). The leaves are evergreen, 6–12 cm (2.4–4.7 in) long and 2–4 cm (0.79–1.57 in) broad. The flowers are 3–4.5 cm (1.2–1.8 in) in diameter, violet-purple, often with small spots or streaks, blooming from April through June. The fruit is a dry capsule 15–20 mm (19/32–25/32 in) long, containing numerous small seeds.

The species is named after the Catawba River.

== Classification ==
Rhododendron catawbiense belongs to the subgenus Hymenanthes, within which it is further assigned to section Ponticum and subsection Pontica. The latter—one of the 24 subsections of Ponticum—also contains about a dozen other species. The taxonomy has been confused by a tendency to group all large leaved Rhododendrons under the catch-all R. catawbiense.

== Cultivation ==
Rhododendron catawbiense is cultivated as an ornamental plant in North America and in parts of Europe. It is primarily grown for its spring flower display. Outside of its native range, many cultivars and hybrids have been created.

== See also ==
- Catawbiense hybrid
- Central and southern Appalachian montane oak forest
- Southern Appalachian spruce-fir forest
