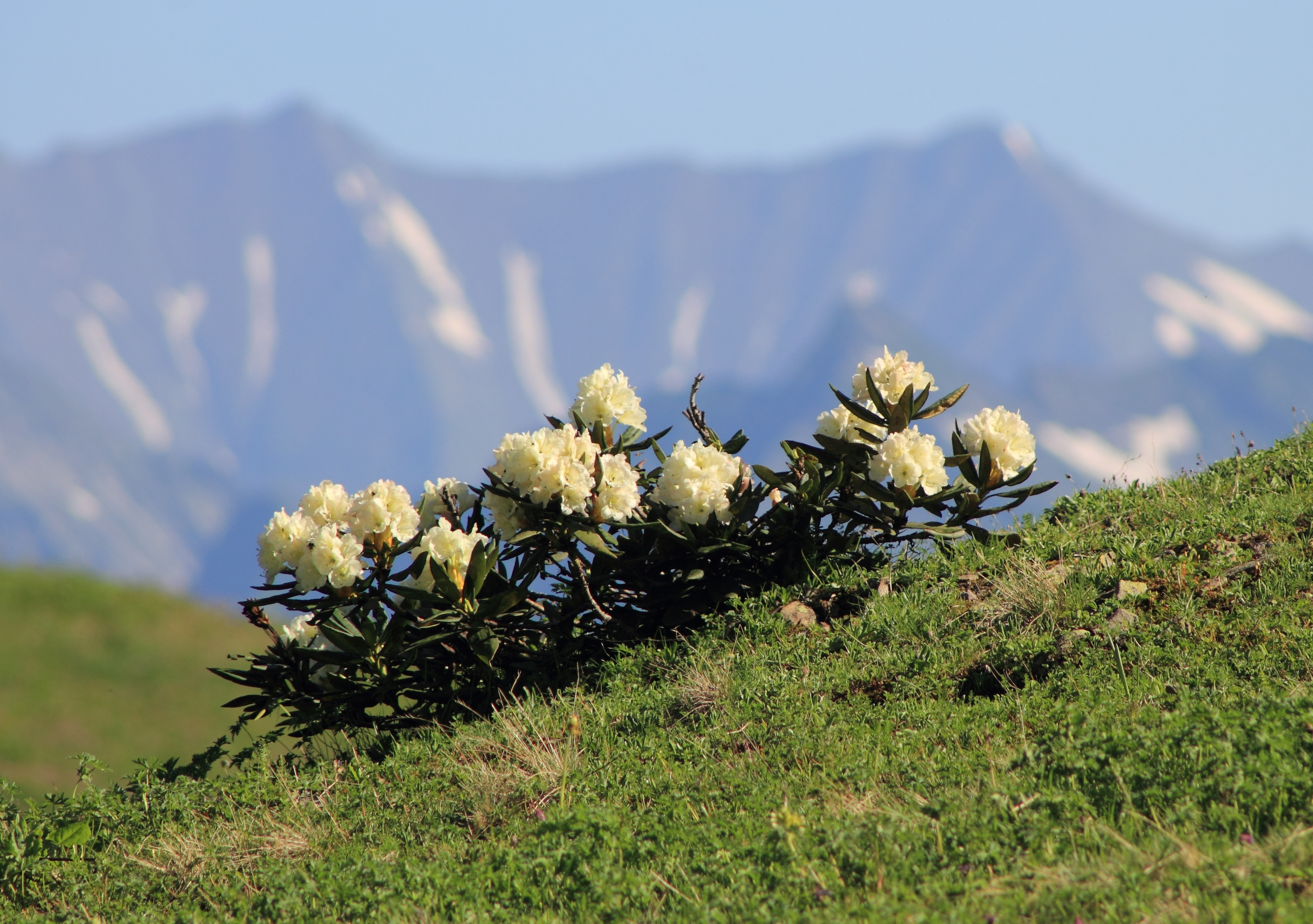

Scientific classification
- Kingdom: Plantae
- Clade: Embryophytes
- Clade: Tracheophytes
- Clade: Spermatophytes
- Clade: Angiosperms
- Clade: Eudicots
- Clade: Asterids
- Order: Ericales
- Family: Ericaceae
- Genus: Rhododendron
- Species: R. caucasicum

Binomial name
- Rhododendron caucasicum Pall.

Synonyms
- List: Azalea caucasica (Pall.) Kuntze; Rhododendron caucaseum Sims

= Rhododendron caucasicum =

Species of flowering plant

Rhododendron caucasicum, the Caucasian rhododendron or the Georgian snow rose, is a species of flowering plant in the genus Rhododendron native to the Transcaucasus and Anatolia. Its hybrid cultivar 'Christmas Cheer' has gained the Royal Horticultural Society's Award of Garden Merit.
