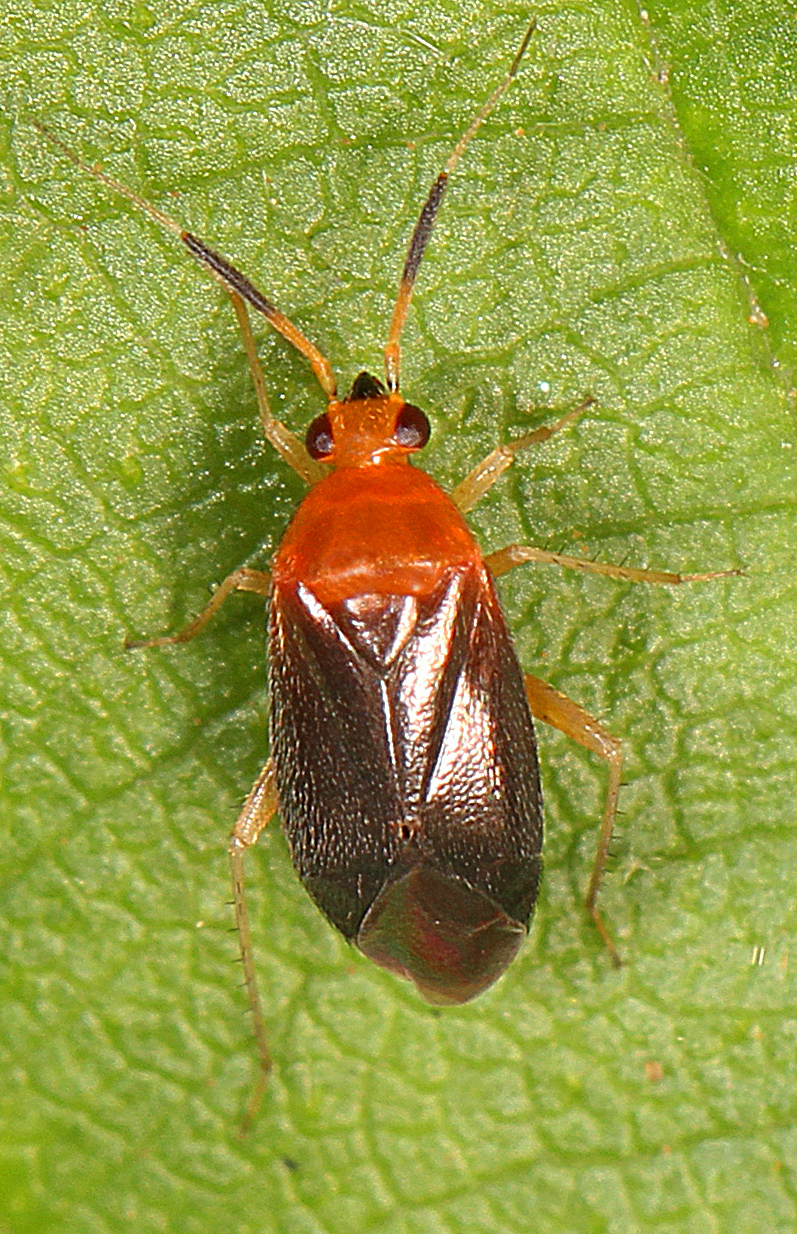

Scientific classification
- Kingdom: Animalia
- Phylum: Arthropoda
- Class: Insecta
- Order: Hemiptera
- Suborder: Heteroptera
- Family: Miridae
- Subfamily: Phylinae
- Tribe: Phylini
- Genus: Rhinocapsus
- Species: R. vanduzeei

Binomial name
- Rhinocapsus vanduzeei Uhler, 1890

= Rhinocapsus vanduzeei =

Species of true bug

Rhinocapsus vanduzeei, the azalea plant bug, is a species of plant bug in the family Miridae. It is found in North America. As well as feeding on azaleas, the species also feeds on Lepidopteran eggs, whiteflies, and thrips.

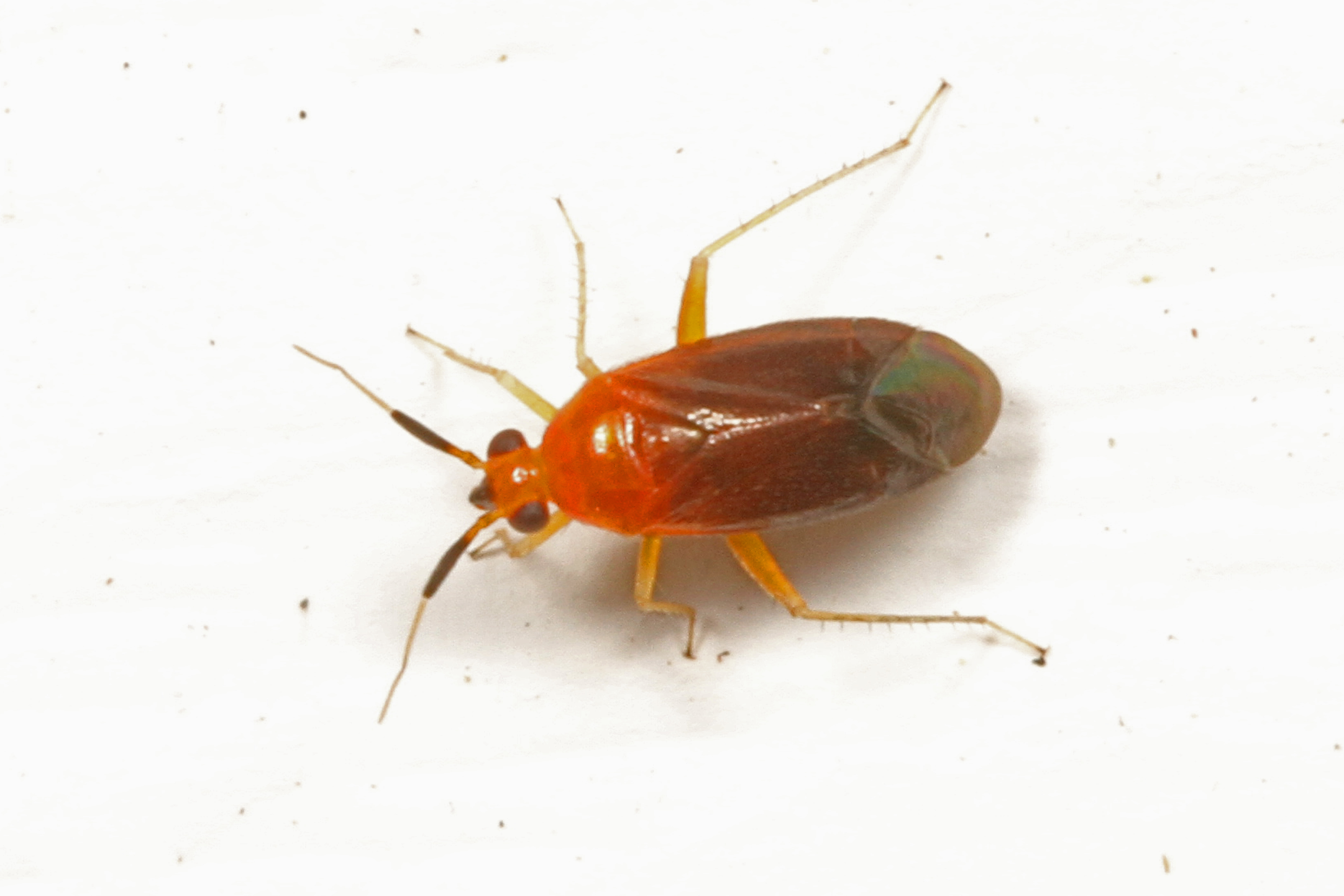
Azalea plant bug, Rhinocapsus vanduzeei
