= Viseu =

- City, municipality and district capital
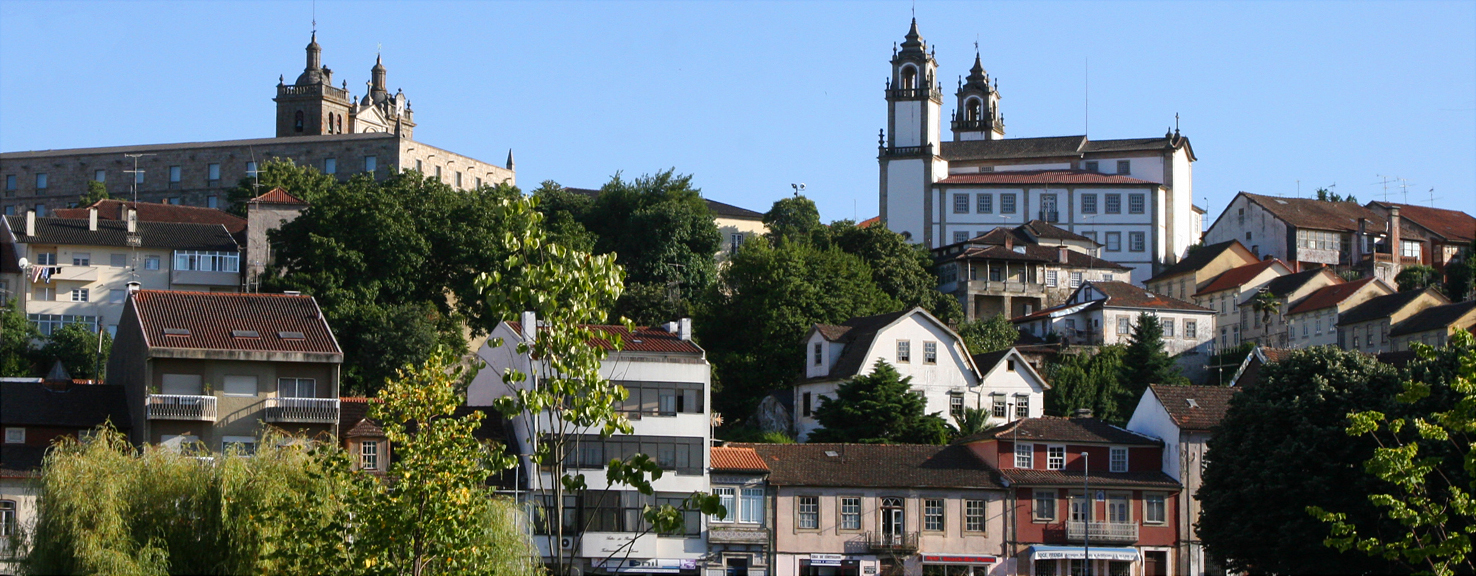
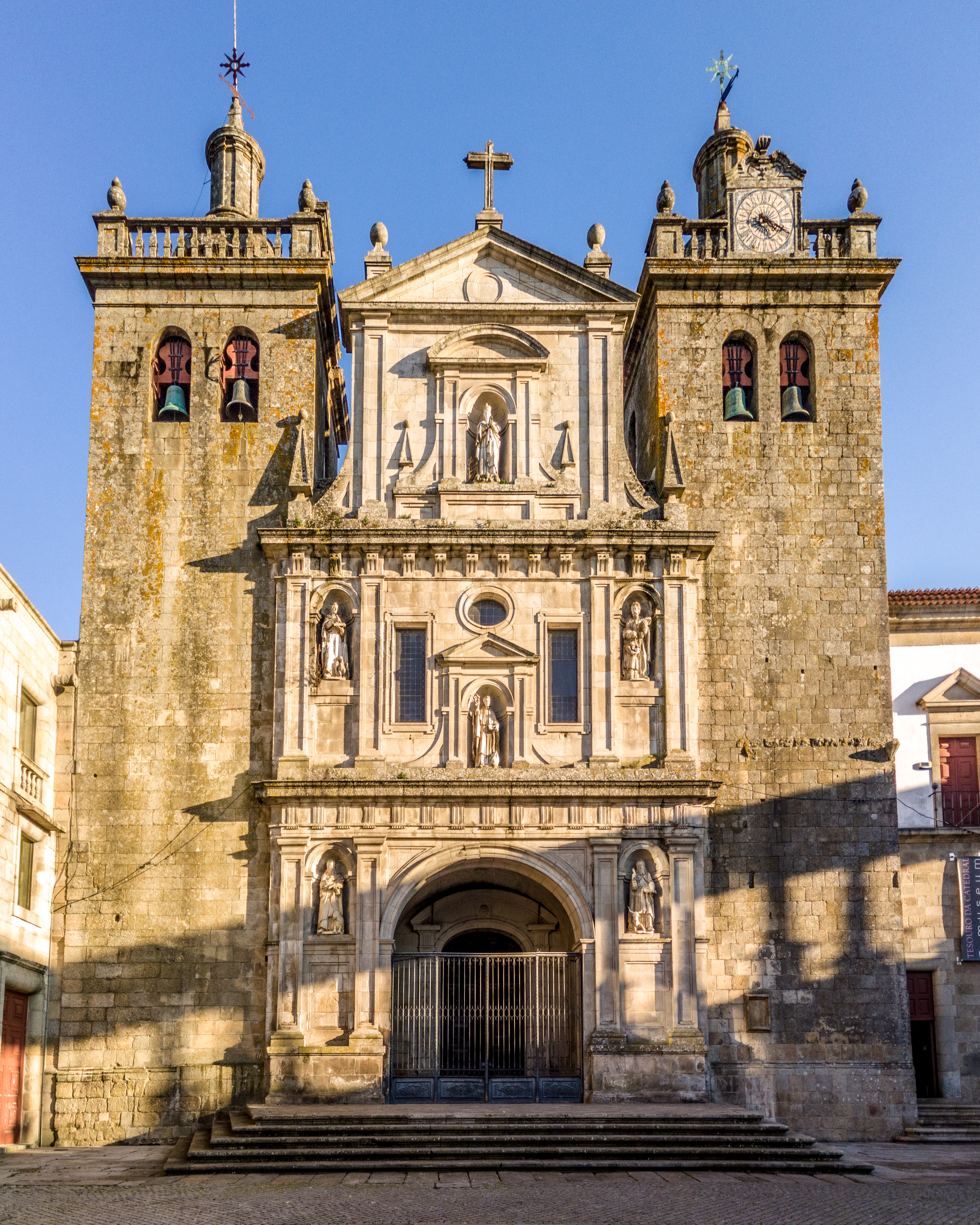
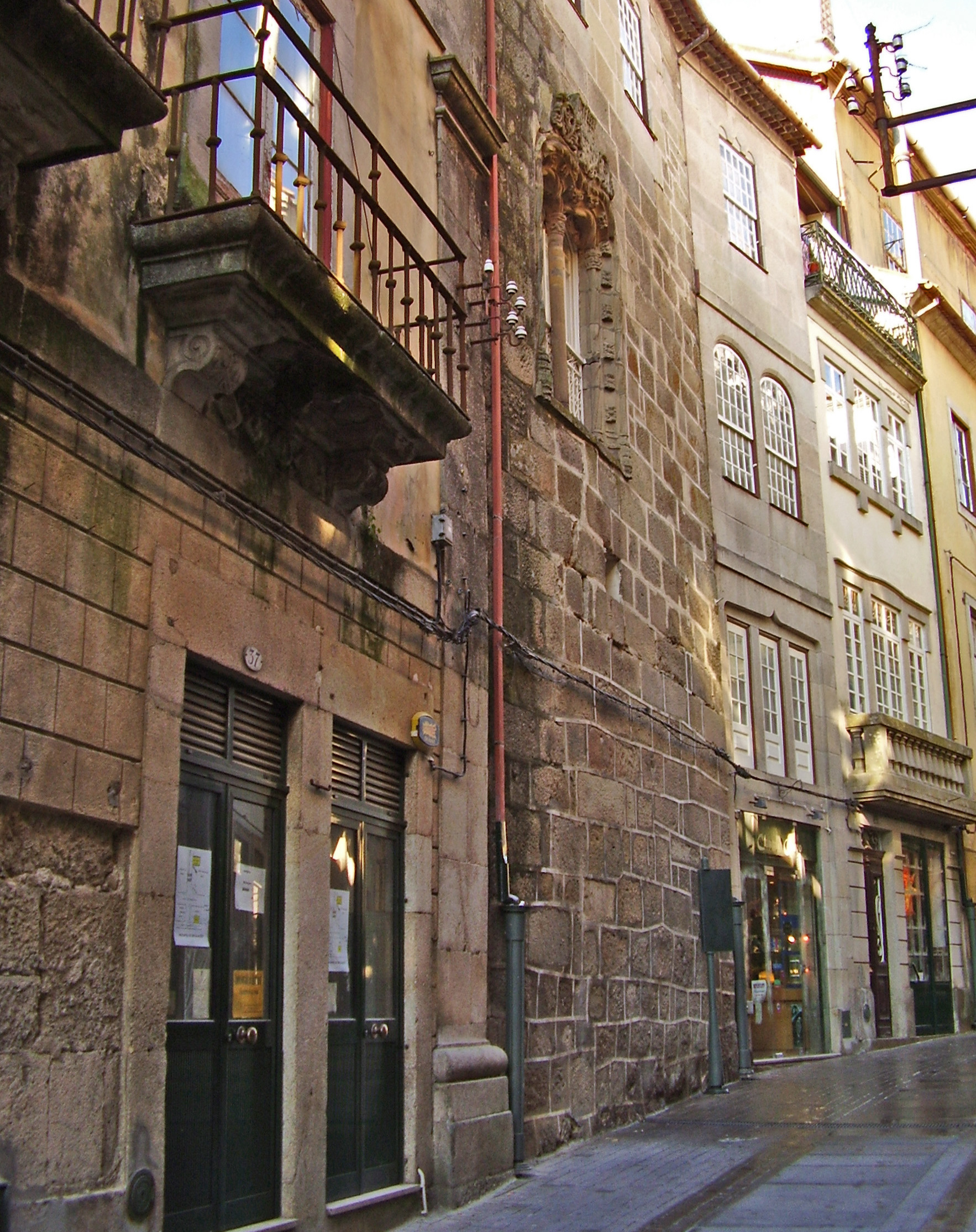
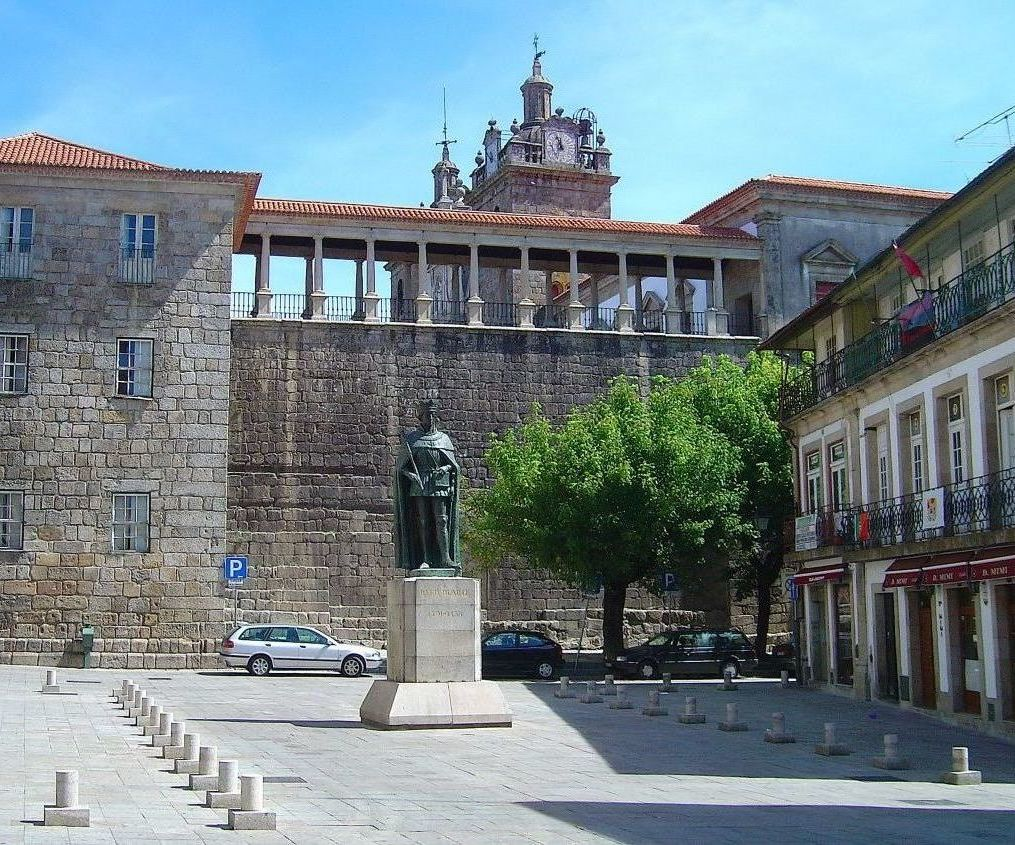
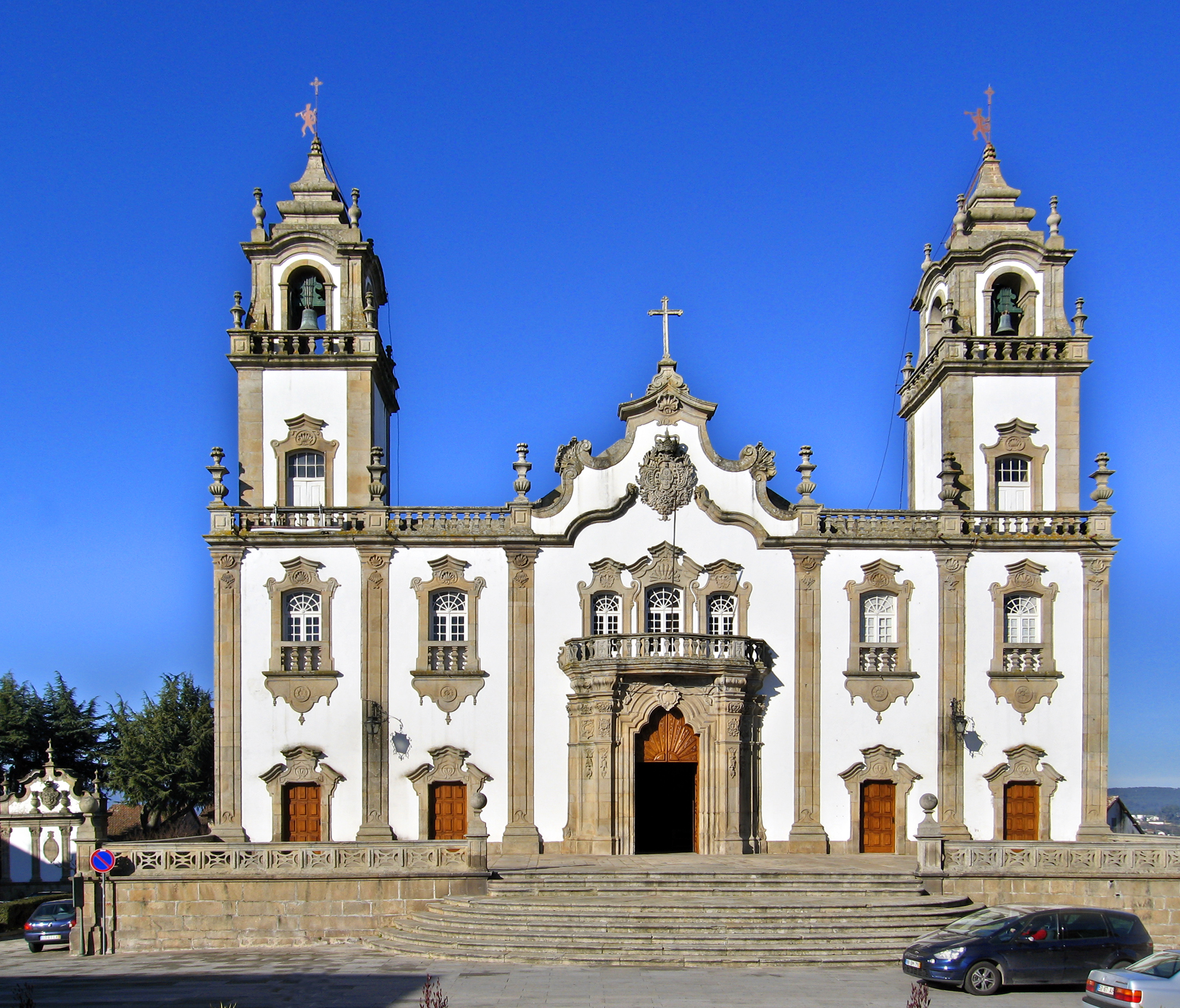
- From top, left to right: Panorama of Viseu from Ribeira; Viseu Cathedral; Paço da Torre [pt]; Praça D. Duarte; Igreja da Misericórdia [pt]

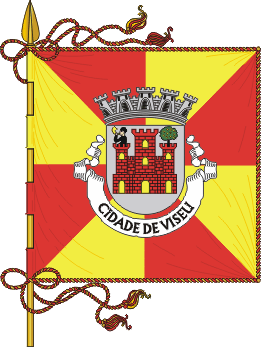
- Flag Coat of arms
- Interactive map of Viseu
- Location within Portugal
- Coordinates: 40°40′N 7°55′W
- Country: Portugal
- Region: Central Portugal
- Intermunicipal community: Viseu Dão Lafões
- District: Viseu
- Historical province: Beira Alta (1936 map), Beira (pre-1832)
- Civil parishes: 25

Government
  - Type: Municipality (LAU)
  - Body: Câmara Municipal (executive); Municipal Assembly (deliberative)
  - Mayor (2025-29): João Azevedo (PS)
  - President of the Assembly: José Mota Faria (PSD)

Area
  - Total: 507.10 km^{2} (195.79 sq mi)

Population (2021)
  - Total: 109,166
  - Density: 215.28/km^{2} (557.56/sq mi)
- Demonym(s): viseense, visiense
- Time zone: UTC+00:00 (WET)
  - Summer (DST): UTC+01:00 (WEST)
- Postal codes: 3500, 3505, 3510, 3515
- Area code: 232
- Dicofre code: 1823
- Patron saint: Saint Theotonius of Coimbra
- Municipal holiday: 21 September (Saint Matthew)
- Website: www.cm-beja.pt

Viseu, (Note: Portuguese pronunciation: [viˈzew]) officially the City of Viseu, is a city and municipality in the Central Region of Portugal and the capital of the district of the same name, with a population of 109,166 inhabitants in the entire municipality, and center of the Viseu Dão Lafões intermunicipal community, with 267,633 inhabitants.

Settled during the period of the early Iberian Castro culture, the territory of Viseu was occupied by a series of other peoples including the Romans, Suebians, Visigoths and Moors. During the Roman occupation of Iberia, Viriathus, the rebel leader of the Lusitanians, is assumed to have lived for a time in the vicinity. During the Middle Ages, the city often served as a seat for Visigothic nobles (such as King Roderic), and based in the Chronica Gothorum is one of several probable birthplaces for Afonso Henriques, first King of Portugal.

Viseu is a regional economic hub with a strong wine industry and is the seat of the international conglomerate Visabeira. The city is also a cultural center, home to the nationally acclaimed Grão Vasco Museum, the seat of the Roman Catholic Diocese of Viseu, and a center for higher learning institutions, namely the Catholic University of Portugal and the Polytechnic Institute of Viseu.

== History ==
The origins of the city of Viseu date back to the pre-Roman period of the Celts and Lusitanians. Vissaîegobor is the name given to the settlement that later became the city of Viseu, Portugal, during the pre-Roman period. It is believed to be of Celtic or Lusitanian origin. The city was renamed as *Vissaium during the Romanization period, with a possible Latinized suffix.

With its Romanisation the settlement gained importance, being at the intersection of a series of Roman roads linking Mérida, Lisbon, and Galicia.

Viseu is historically associated with Viriathus, the Lusitanian hero believed have been born in this region. After the Roman occupation of the peninsula, under the Suebians and then the Visigoths, the settlement was elevated to the status of city and to the seat of a diocese in the 6th century.

=== Middle Ages ===
The origins of Viseu extend to proto-history, when migrating groups settled the territory, including the Celts and Lusitanians. Roman colonists settled in these territories during eras of prosperity and peace, leading eventually to a succession of rulers, namely Suebic, Gothic and Muslim. By the mid sixth century, the Suebians had already established a community, with a bishop elected by the suffrage of Roman Catholic Archdiocese of Braga.

During the Reconquista, the lands of Viseu switched hands several times until the troops of Ferdinand I of León permanently retook the territories and finally expelled the Moors, among much destruction. The Diocese of Viseu had its first bishop as early as 561 and continued intermittently, even during Moorish occupation. For many years it was incorporated into the Bishopric of Coimbra, due to the intervention of the clergy, including St Teotónio. In the 12th century, Viseu began regaining its importance as an urban centre. Peace lasted for the next three centuries after that, allowing the city to prosper. Following the death of King Ferdinand I, the Castilians sought to enforce (by force-of-arms), its rights to the lands/territories of the County of Portugal, bringing unrest once more.

During Countship of Portugal, Viseu had served as the seat of the Court for Henry, Count of Portugal and Countess Teresa, who granted a foral to the city in 1123. Viseu is believed as one of the possible birthplaces of their son Afonso Henriques, the first official Portuguese monarch, in 1109. Following the successful defense of his hereditary rights, and supported by nobles and clergy, Afonso Henriques founded the kingdom of Portugal. Viseu was granted a new charter 1187, that was later reinforced by his grandson, King Afonso II of Portugal, in 1217.

During the 1383–85 Crisis, the city was besieged by the forces of Juan I of Castile, leading to King John I of Portugal starting construction on a series of defensive fortifications which would continue being built until the reign of King Afonso V of Portugal.

The city became part of a fiefdom, when Prince Henry the Navigator, son of King John I of Portugal, was made Duke of Viseu, in 1415.

In 1475, Vasco Fernandes, a famed artist of the Portuguese Renaissance, was born in the city,

In 1513, King Manuel I of Portugal renewed the charter of Viseu and a series of works were taken on throughout the city, with the opening of the first square of the city, the Rossio.

In the 19th century, a new Municipal Palace was built in the Rossio, significantly altering the flow of the city, moving it away from the medieval center to newer parts of the city.

== Geography ==
Viseu is approximately 50 km (31 mi) East of the Atlantic Ocean. Surrounded by a number of mountains – Leomil, Montemuro, Lapa, Arada, Estrela and Caramulo – the tops of which are covered with thick layers of snow in Winter time, the district is crossed by a network of rivers and streamlets.

The city of Viseu has an almost central position in relation to the District lying on the so-called Viseu Plateau (in Portuguese Planalto de Viseu). It is surrounded by a mountainous system constituted to the north by the Leonil, Montemuro, and Lapa hills, to the northeast by the Arado hills, to the south and southeast by the Serra da Estrela and the Serra da Lousã [pt] and to the west by the Serra do Caramulo.

The municipality is characterized by an irregular surface with altitudes ranging between 400 and 700 metres (1,300 and 2,300 feet). With rough terrain, it has numerous water courses. These are found in three basins: the Vouga, the Dão and the Paiva, the latter of which runs through the city itself.

=== Climate ===
Situated in a zone of transition, the concelho (municipality) has several micro-climates. The Serra do Caramulo, located to the west of the city, plays an important role in climatic terms by lessening the influences of the western air masses (although the Mondego River's basin makes the penetration easier). Consequently, Viseu's climate is characterized by the existence of high temperature extremes, with cold and wet winters and hot and dry summers.

Viseu has a Mediterranean climate (Csb, bordering Csa), with the 1981–2010 averages indicating it just below the 22 °C (72 °F) isotherm. Its inland position and relative altitude contribute to cooler winters than in coastal areas of the country, with an average of 31 days of frost per year; regular snowfall, as well as a relatively large diurnal temperature variation and lower averages than more low-lying inland cities in the central-north area of the country such as Castelo Branco. In spite of its inland position, the maritime influence is strong enough for there to be a seasonal lag resulting in September averaging similar temperatures as June for the 1981–2010 reference period. This also applies to October and May. However, temperatures drop sharply in November, resulting in a smaller lag for the winter season. July and August are the driest and hottest months, with daytime highs averaging 29.6 °C (85.3 °F) for both months. Winters are much wetter with an average December precipitation of 203.4 millimetres (8 in).

Climate data for Viseu, 1981-2010 normals and extremes, altitude: 443 m (1,453 ft)
Month	Jan	Feb	Mar	Apr	May	Jun	Jul	Aug	Sep	Oct	Nov	Dec	Year
Record high °C (°F)	20.7 (69.3)	22.6 (72.7)	27.6 (81.7)	30.3 (86.5)	33.0 (91.4)	39.0 (102.2)	40.5 (104.9)	40.4 (104.7)	39.6 (103.3)	31.2 (88.2)	27.3 (81.1)	22.5 (72.5)	40.5 (104.9)
Mean daily maximum °C (°F)	11.9 (53.4)	13.8 (56.8)	16.9 (62.4)	17.6 (63.7)	20.6 (69.1)	26.2 (79.2)	29.6 (85.3)	29.6 (85.3)	26.1 (79.0)	20.1 (68.2)	15.1 (59.2)	12.7 (54.9)	20.0 (68.0)
Daily mean °C (°F)	7.1 (44.8)	8.6 (47.5)	11.0 (51.8)	11.9 (53.4)	14.7 (58.5)	19.0 (66.2)	21.7 (71.1)	21.6 (70.9)	19.0 (66.2)	14.7 (58.5)	10.6 (51.1)	8.5 (47.3)	14.0 (57.3)
Mean daily minimum °C (°F)	2.2 (36.0)	3.3 (37.9)	5.2 (41.4)	6.2 (43.2)	8.8 (47.8)	11.7 (53.1)	13.8 (56.8)	13.5 (56.3)	11.9 (53.4)	9.1 (48.4)	6.0 (42.8)	4.2 (39.6)	8.0 (46.4)
Record low °C (°F)	−6.6 (20.1)	−7.3 (18.9)	−5.4 (22.3)	−2.6 (27.3)	−0.5 (31.1)	2.6 (36.7)	5.3 (41.5)	6.0 (42.8)	3.0 (37.4)	0.7 (33.3)	−3.5 (25.7)	−5.0 (23.0)	−7.3 (18.9)
Average precipitation mm (inches)	153.2 (6.03)	105.6 (4.16)	79.0 (3.11)	113.6 (4.47)	103.0 (4.06)	35.2 (1.39)	19.2 (0.76)	17.8 (0.70)	66.0 (2.60)	147.0 (5.79)	155.5 (6.12)	203.4 (8.01)	1,198.5 (47.2)
Source: Instituto Português do Mar e da Atmosfera

Climate data for Viseu Airport, 1991-2020 normals and extremes, altitude: 644 m (2,113 ft)
Month	Jan	Feb	Mar	Apr	May	Jun	Jul	Aug	Sep	Oct	Nov	Dec	Year
Record high °C (°F)	19.5 (67.1)	23.1 (73.6)	25.8 (78.4)	28.3 (82.9)	33.2 (91.8)	37.6 (99.7)	39.4 (102.9)	40.5 (104.9)	38.6 (101.5)	33.4 (92.1)	23.4 (74.1)	19.8 (67.6)	40.5 (104.9)
Mean daily maximum °C (°F)	10.6 (51.1)	12.2 (54.0)	15.2 (59.4)	16.7 (62.1)	20.1 (68.2)	24.3 (75.7)	28.0 (82.4)	28.3 (82.9)	24.6 (76.3)	19.0 (66.2)	13.4 (56.1)	11.2 (52.2)	18.6 (65.5)
Daily mean °C (°F)	7.3 (45.1)	8.3 (46.9)	10.7 (51.3)	12.0 (53.6)	15.0 (59.0)	18.5 (65.3)	21.3 (70.3)	21.7 (71.1)	19.1 (66.4)	15.0 (59.0)	10.1 (50.2)	8.0 (46.4)	13.9 (57.0)
Mean daily minimum °C (°F)	3.9 (39.0)	4.3 (39.7)	6.1 (43.0)	7.3 (45.1)	9.8 (49.6)	12.7 (54.9)	14.6 (58.3)	15.1 (59.2)	13.5 (56.3)	10.9 (51.6)	6.8 (44.2)	4.8 (40.6)	9.2 (48.6)
Record low °C (°F)	−4.3 (24.3)	−4.5 (23.9)	−6.8 (19.8)	−1.2 (29.8)	1.8 (35.2)	4.6 (40.3)	7.3 (45.1)	6.9 (44.4)	5.8 (42.4)	0.0 (32.0)	−0.9 (30.4)	−2.9 (26.8)	−6.8 (19.8)
Average precipitation mm (inches)	176.4 (6.94)	105.6 (4.16)	79.0 (3.11)	113.6 (4.47)	103.0 (4.06)	35.2 (1.39)	19.2 (0.76)	17.8 (0.70)	66.0 (2.60)	147.0 (5.79)	155.5 (6.12)	203.4 (8.01)	1,257.7 (49.52)
Average precipitation days (≥ 1 mm)	11.9	9.2	9.1	11.6	9.7	4.7	2.3	2.8	5.5	10.9	11.9	11.9	101.7
Source: Instituto Português do Mar e da Atmosfera

Climate data for Viseu, 1971-2000 normals and extremes
Month	Jan	Feb	Mar	Apr	May	Jun	Jul	Aug	Sep	Oct	Nov	Dec	Year
Record high °C (°F)	20.0 (68.0)	22.5 (72.5)	27.4 (81.3)	30.3 (86.5)	33.0 (91.4)	39.0 (102.2)	40.5 (104.9)	40.4 (104.7)	39.6 (103.3)	31.2 (88.2)	24.6 (76.3)	22.5 (72.5)	40.5 (104.9)
Mean daily maximum °C (°F)	11.6 (52.9)	13.2 (55.8)	15.9 (60.6)	17.1 (62.8)	20.2 (68.4)	25.4 (77.7)	29.2 (84.6)	29.2 (84.6)	25.9 (78.6)	19.8 (67.6)	15.0 (59.0)	12.4 (54.3)	19.6 (67.2)
Daily mean °C (°F)	6.9 (44.4)	8.4 (47.1)	10.3 (50.5)	11.5 (52.7)	14.3 (57.7)	18.4 (65.1)	21.4 (70.5)	21.1 (70.0)	18.8 (65.8)	14.2 (57.6)	10.2 (50.4)	8.1 (46.6)	13.6 (56.5)
Mean daily minimum °C (°F)	2.2 (36.0)	3.5 (38.3)	4.6 (40.3)	6.0 (42.8)	8.5 (47.3)	11.5 (52.7)	13.5 (56.3)	13.0 (55.4)	11.7 (53.1)	8.5 (47.3)	5.3 (41.5)	3.8 (38.8)	7.7 (45.8)
Record low °C (°F)	−6.6 (20.1)	−7.3 (18.9)	−5.4 (22.3)	−3.8 (25.2)	−0.5 (31.1)	2.0 (35.6)	5.3 (41.5)	6.0 (42.8)	2.0 (35.6)	−2.8 (27.0)	−3.6 (25.5)	−5.0 (23.0)	−7.3 (18.9)
Average precipitation mm (inches)	155.7 (6.13)	133.6 (5.26)	74.8 (2.94)	105.2 (4.14)	95.9 (3.78)	46.1 (1.81)	19.2 (0.76)	17.9 (0.70)	57.0 (2.24)	133.2 (5.24)	135.9 (5.35)	195.4 (7.69)	1,169.9 (46.04)
Source: Instituto Português do Mar e da Atmosfera

=== Human geography ===
Population of Viseu (1801–2024)
Year	Pop.	±%
1801	33,699	—
1849	36,049	+7.0%
1900	54,047	+49.9%
1930	61,140	+13.1%
1960	79,890	+30.7%
1981	83,261	+4.2%
1991	83,601	+0.4%
2001	93,501	+11.8%
2011	99,274	+6.2%
2021	100,237	+1.0%
2024	103,502	+3.3%

Administratively, the municipality is divided into 25 civil parishes:

- Abraveses
- Barreiros e Cepões
- Boa Aldeia, Farminhão e Torredeita
- Bodiosa
- Calde
- Campo
- Cavernães
- Cota
- Couto de Baixo e Couto de Cima
- Faíl e Vila Chã de Sá
- Fragosela
- Lordosa
- Mundão
- Orgens
- Povolide
- Ranhados
- Repeses e São Salvador
- Ribafeita
- Rio de Loba
- Santos Evos
- São Cipriano e Vil de Souto
- São João de Lourosa
- São Pedro de France
- Silgueiros
- Viseu

Due to migration in the 1960s, Viseu suffered a great decline in its population. After the end of the Portuguese Colonial War (1961–1974), with the return of refugees from the Portuguese African colonies that achieved independence ("retornados"), and resulting economic and demographic growth, starting at the end of the 1970s, the municipality increased its population by about 10 percent, giving it an estimated population of 83,261 people. Afterwards, a stagnation set in, confirmed by the 1991 census which showed a population of 83,601.

== International relations ==
As of 2023, Viseu is twinned with:

- Abidjan, Ivory Coast
- Arezzo, Italy
- Campinas, Brazil
- Cantagalo, São Tomé and Príncipe
- Elvas, Portugal
- Haskovo, Bulgaria
- Lublin, Poland
- Marly-le-Roi, France
- Matola, Mozambique
- Rio de Janeiro, Brazil
- São Filipe, Cape Verde
- Taiyuan, China

== Economy ==
The city and the region are famous for its wine (Dão Wine) and the Dão Wine Institute, the Solar do Vinho do Dão can be found in the city. There is also an annual fair, the Feira de São Mateus. Furthermore, Viseu is also known for local handicrafts which include black pottery, bobbin lace, embroidery, and copper and wrought iron articles. With the good connections to major industrial centers and to the ports of Aveiro and Leixões, several industries have been installed in Viseu. Visabeira, a Portugal-based international conglomerate with interests in telecommunications, construction, industry, tourism, real estate and diversified services is headquartered in the city. Viseu also hosts a central hospital (Hospital of São Teotónio), two shopping malls (the Fórum (2005) and the Palácio do Gelo (2008, it includes cinemas and the only ice rink in Portugal)), and numerous hostels and hotels in all categories.

== Transportation ==
The city of Viseu has a bus network – MUV – which operates several lines within the entire municipality and a recently installed funicular connecting the lower city with the upper city. The A25 motorway (IP5) connects Viseu to the seaport of Aveiro and Guarda and then on to Salamanca in Spain. The IP3 and A24, connecting Coimbra with Chaves on the Spanish border, cross Viseu from south to north.

Until the 1980s Viseu had railway connections with the coast, but these were closed making it now one of the largest cities in Europe without a railway connection. It used to be connected to Aveiro (via the Vouga line, a narrow gauge railway), and Santa Comba Dão (on the Dão line, another narrow gauge railway), where it had a connection to the Linha da Beira Alta (broad gauge; international). The Dão line closed to passengers in 1988.

The municipality has an airfield – the Viseu Airport (code VSE) also known as Lobato, parish of Lordosa, Viseu – that offers scheduled commercial flights to some domestic destinations with Aero VIP.

== Education ==
Viseu is the location of the state-run Instituto Politécnico de Viseu which has higher education polytechnic schools of education, technology and management, and agronomy. The city's political and civic groups have been pressuring the national government to upgrade this school into a university, but its desire was never achieved. However, there are 2 private university institutions, the Universidade Católica Portuguesa and the Instituto Piaget. Furthermore, since the Bologna process, the difference between universities and polytechnics is less relevant, with the exception of some degrees like medicine, economics or law, that are only awarded in universities.

There are three secondary education (the Portuguese equivalent of high schools) establishments: the Escola Secundária de Viriato, Escola Secundária Alves Martins and Escola Secundária Emídio Navarro.

== Gallery ==
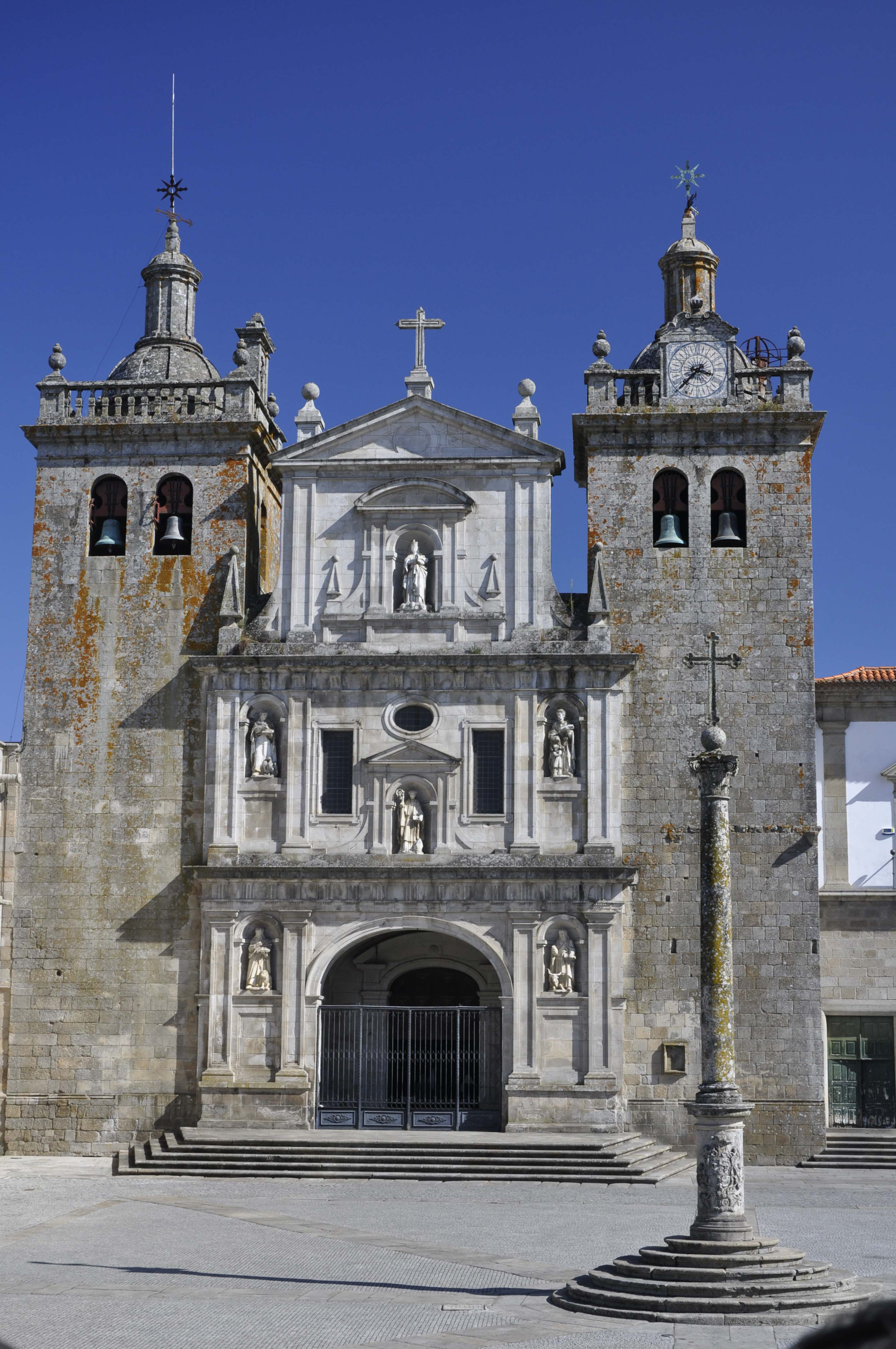
Cathedral of Viseu

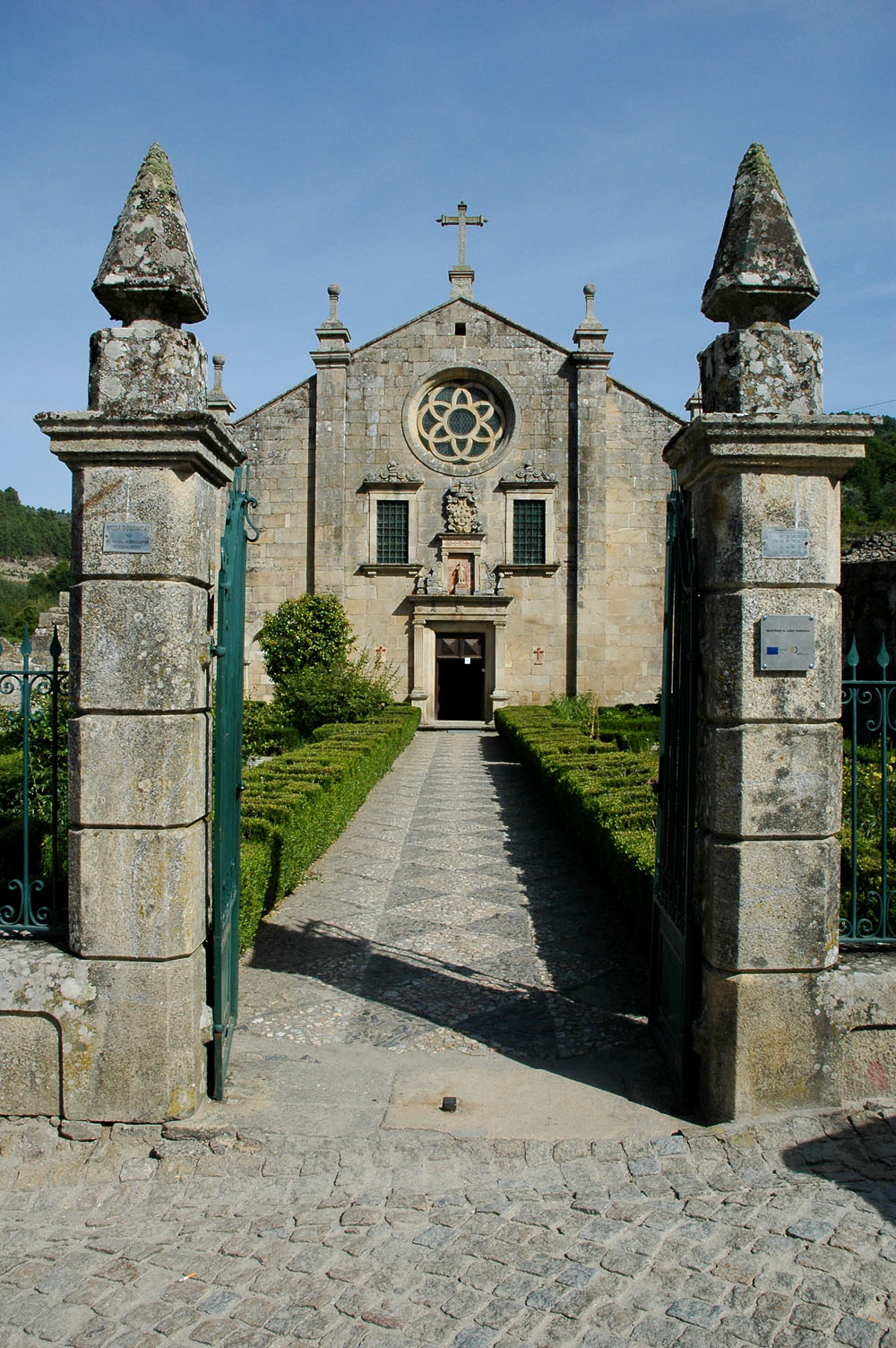
São João da Tarouca Convent

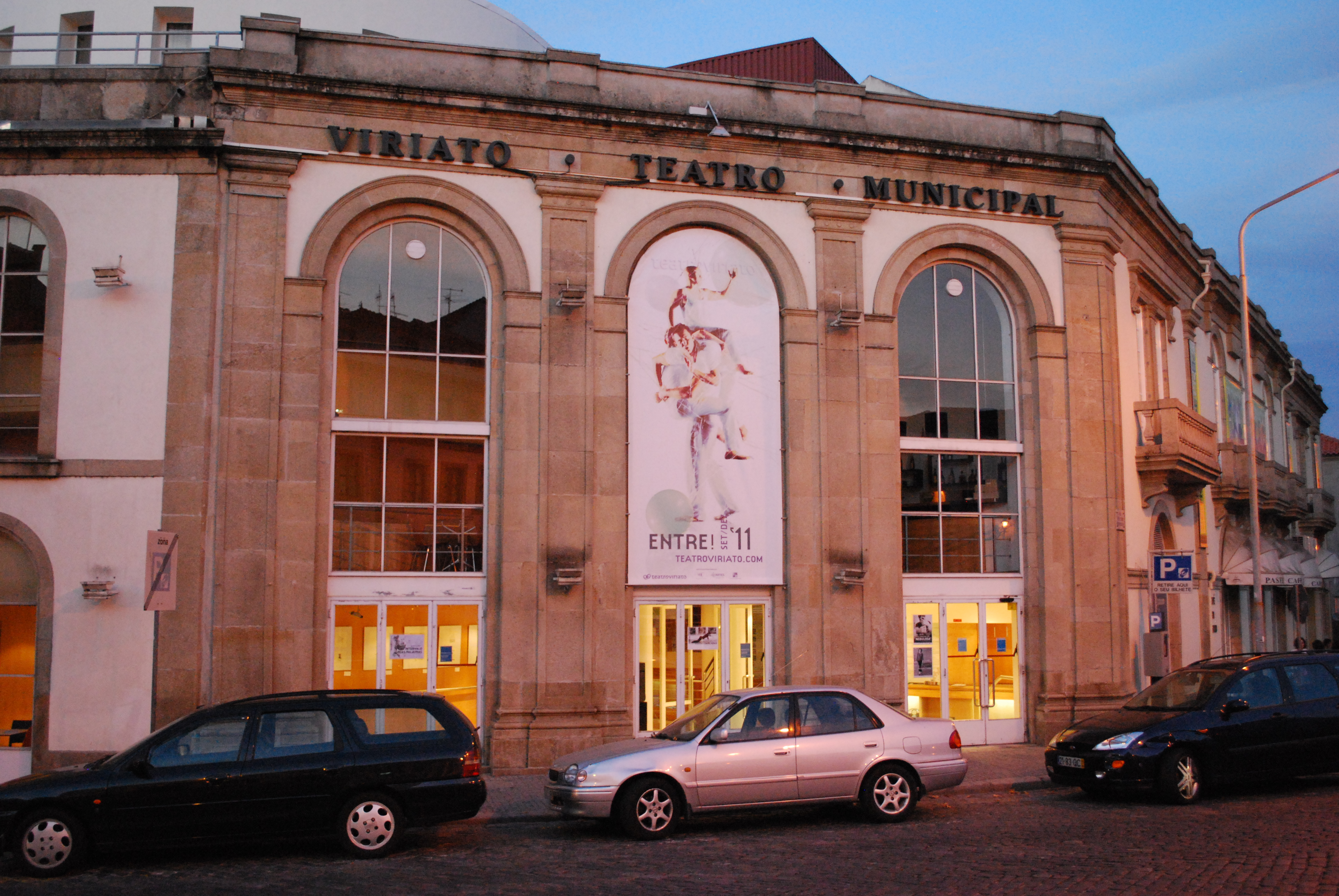
Viriato Theatre, Portugal

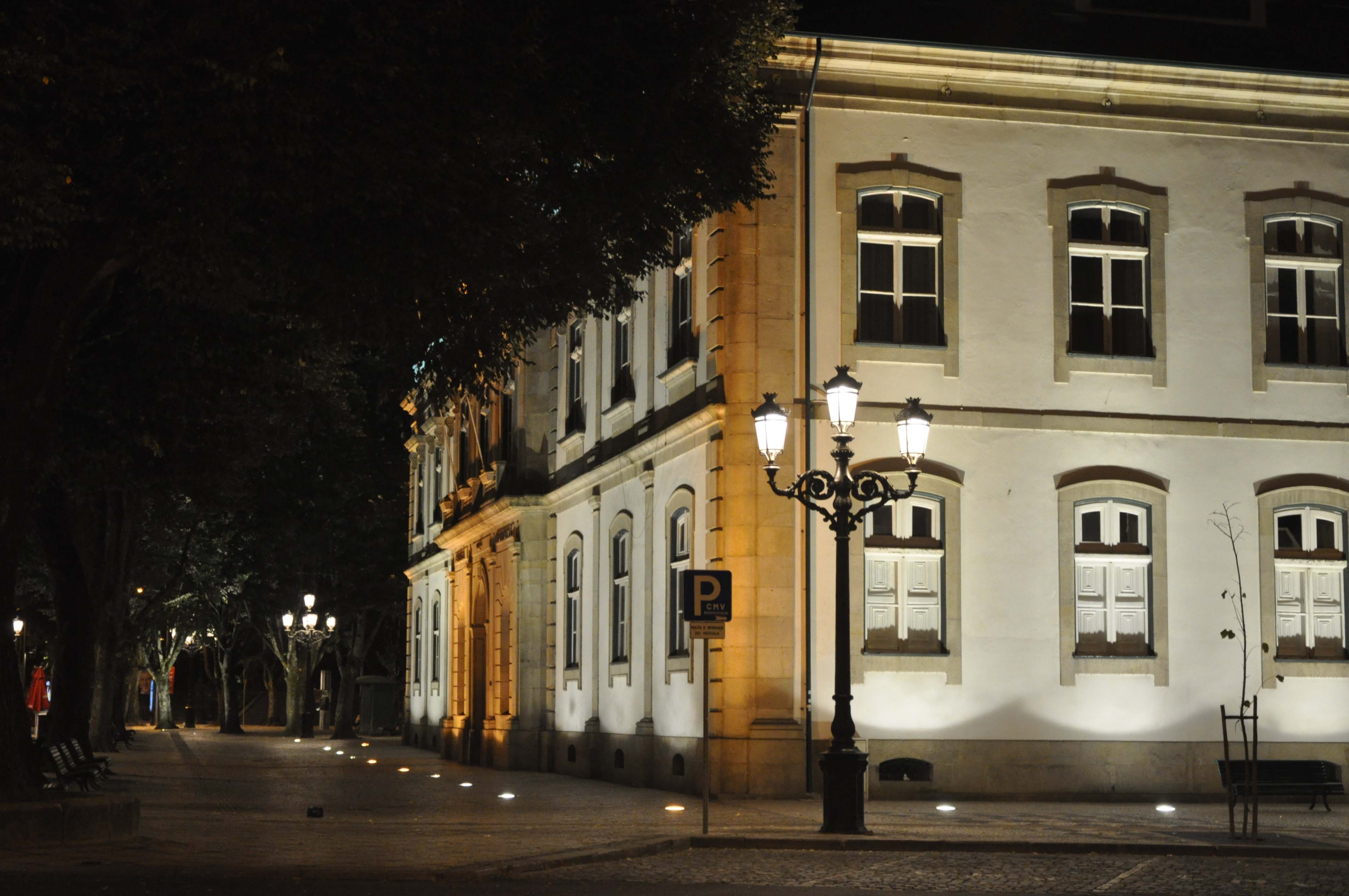
Viseu City Hall

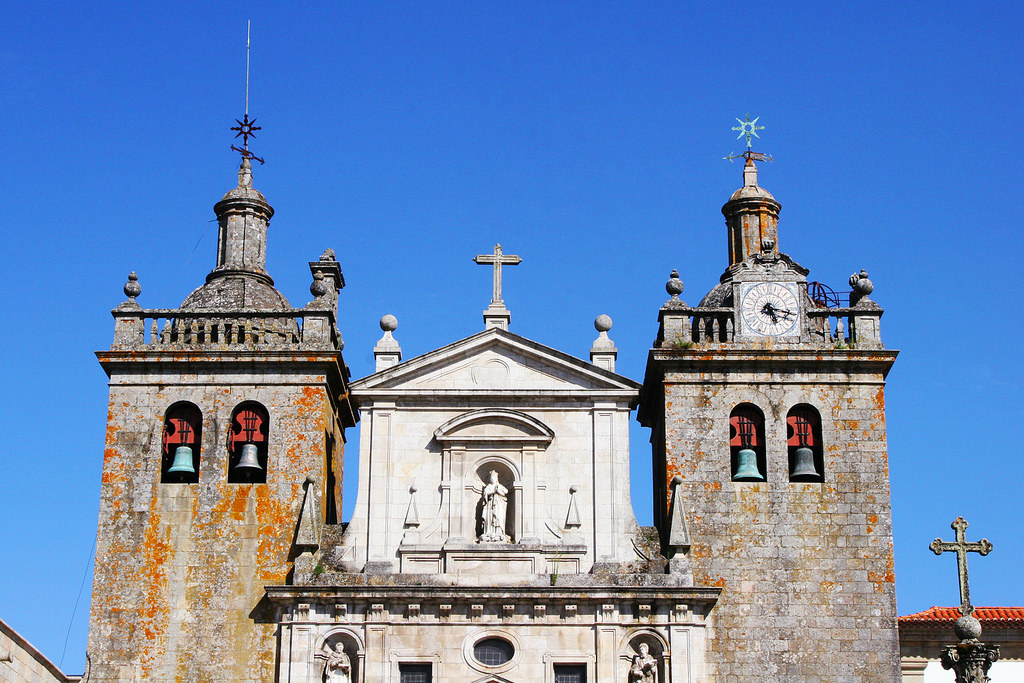
Towers and façade of the Cathedral

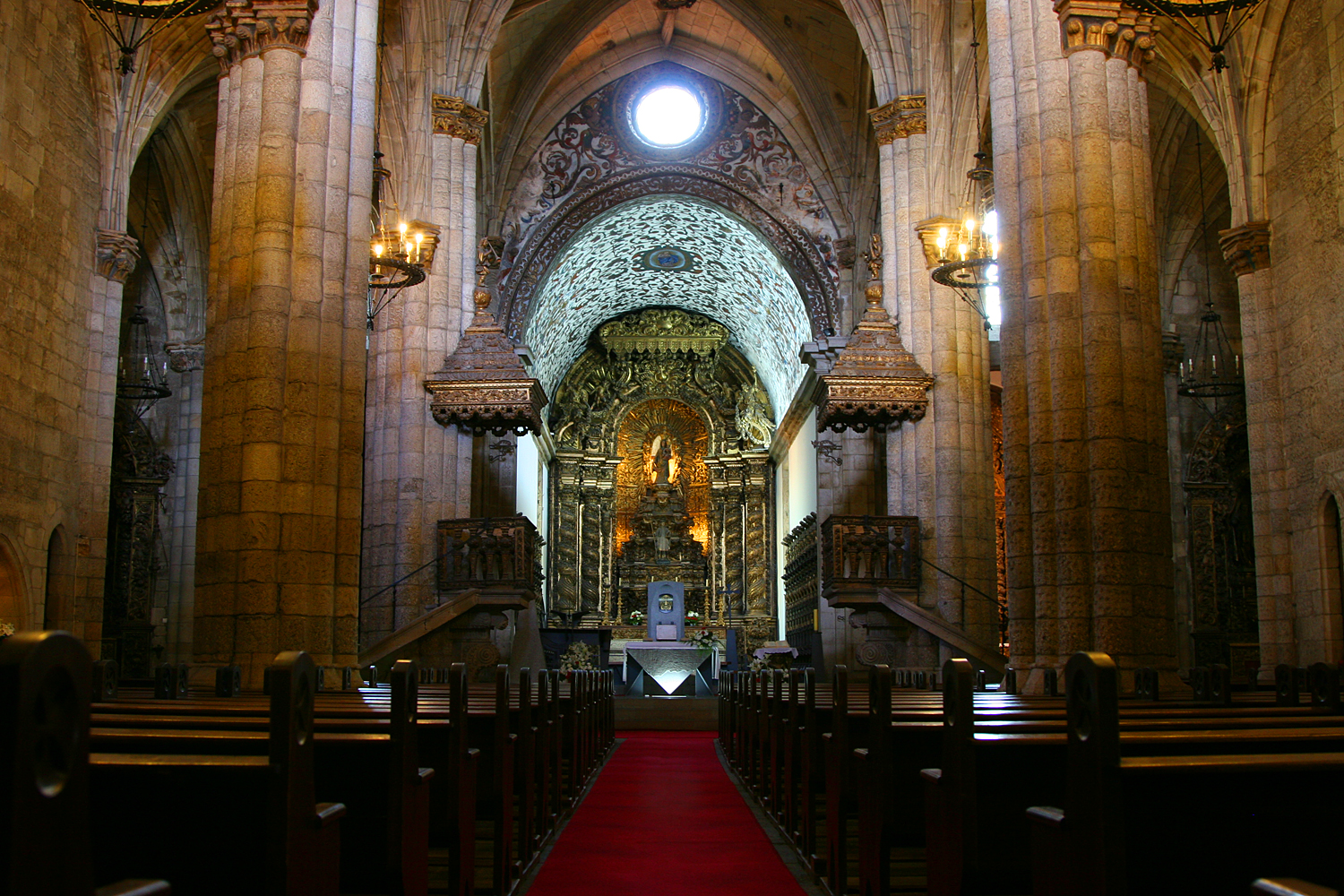
Interior of Viseu Cathedral

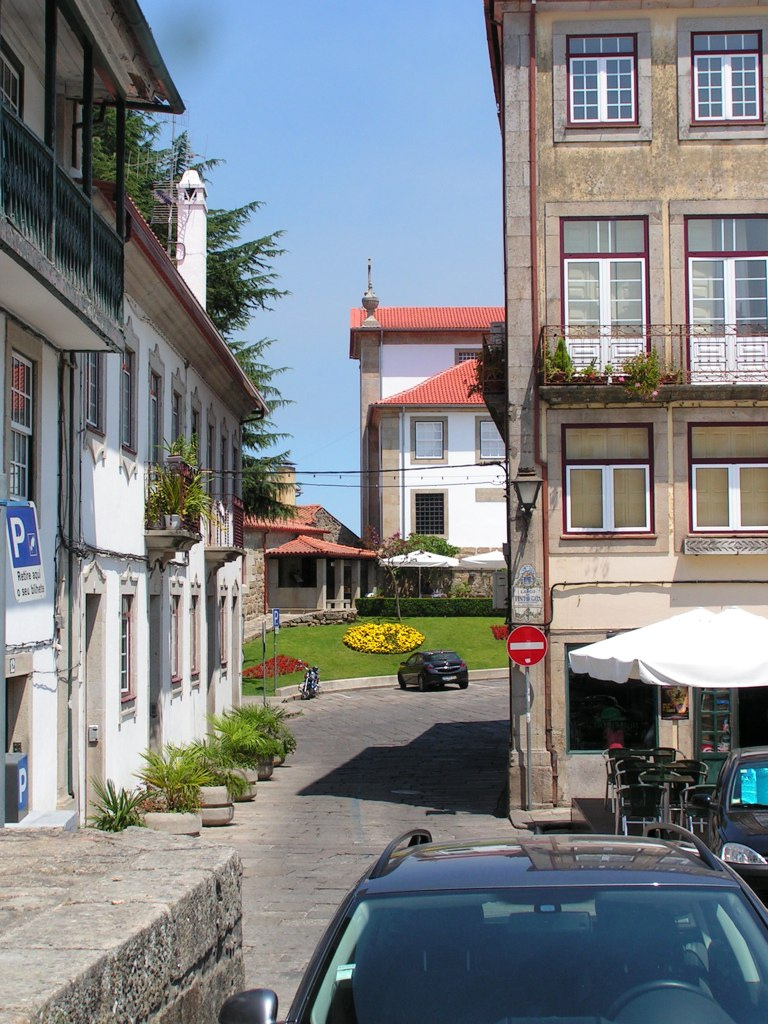
Viseu, Portugal

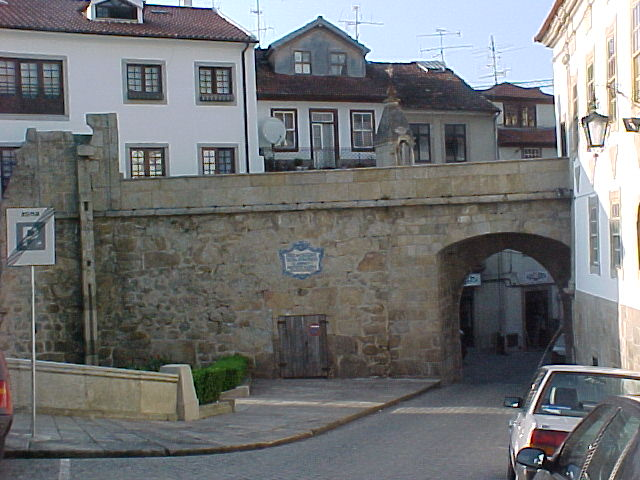
Porta dos Cavaleiros, remains of the city wall.

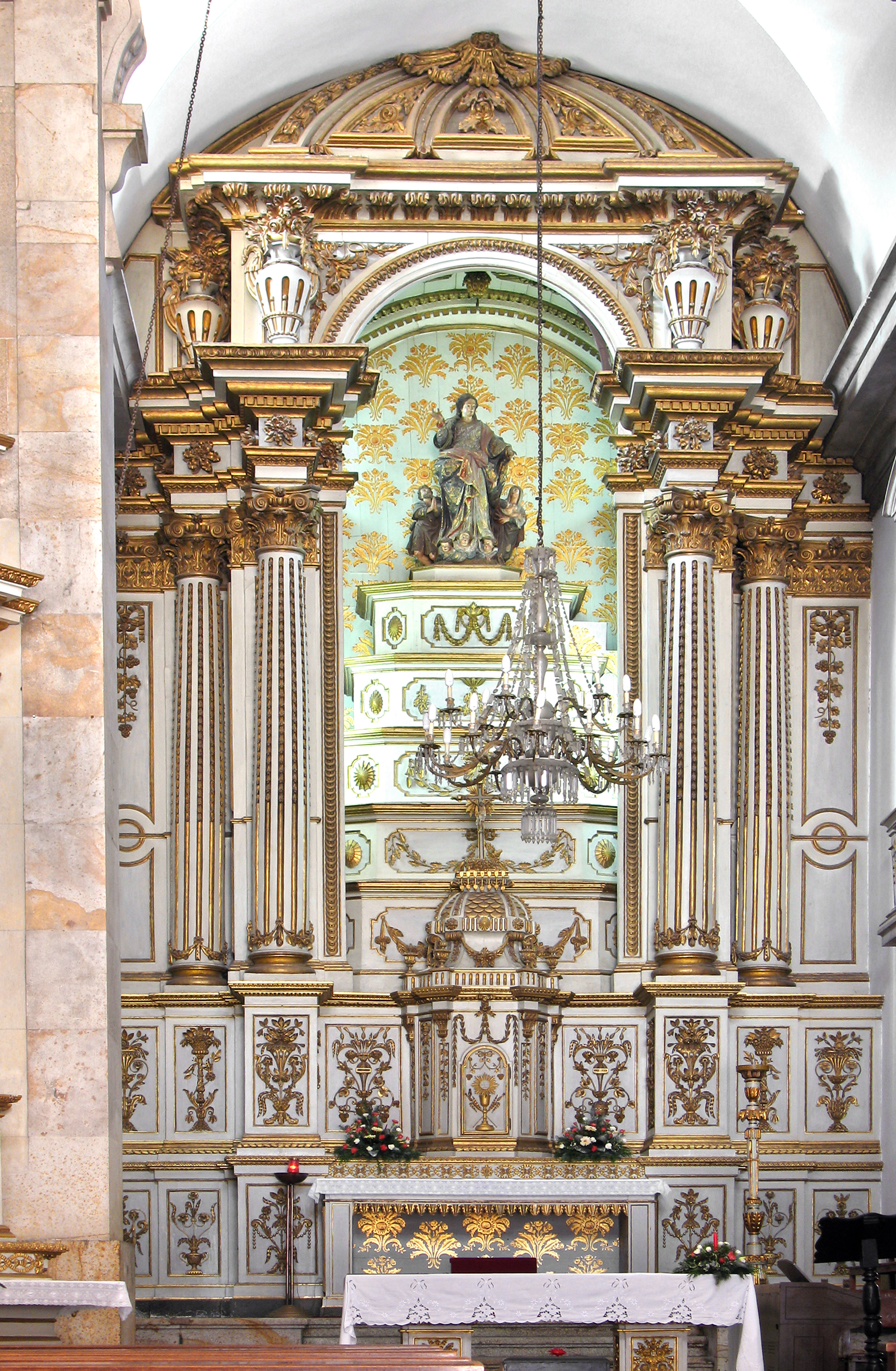
Altar of Igreja da Misericórdia.

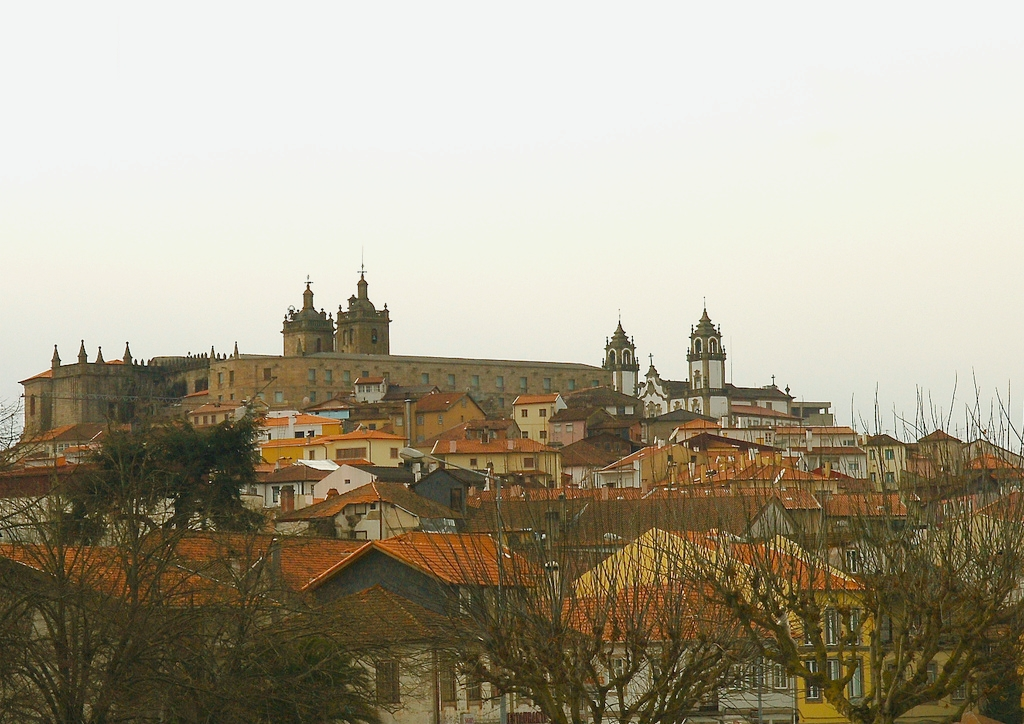
View of Viseu

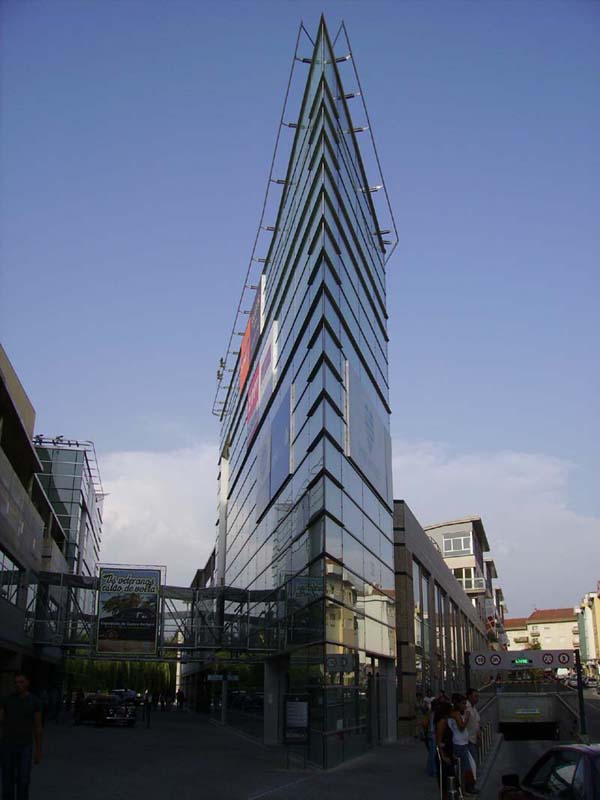
Forum Viseu shopping centre

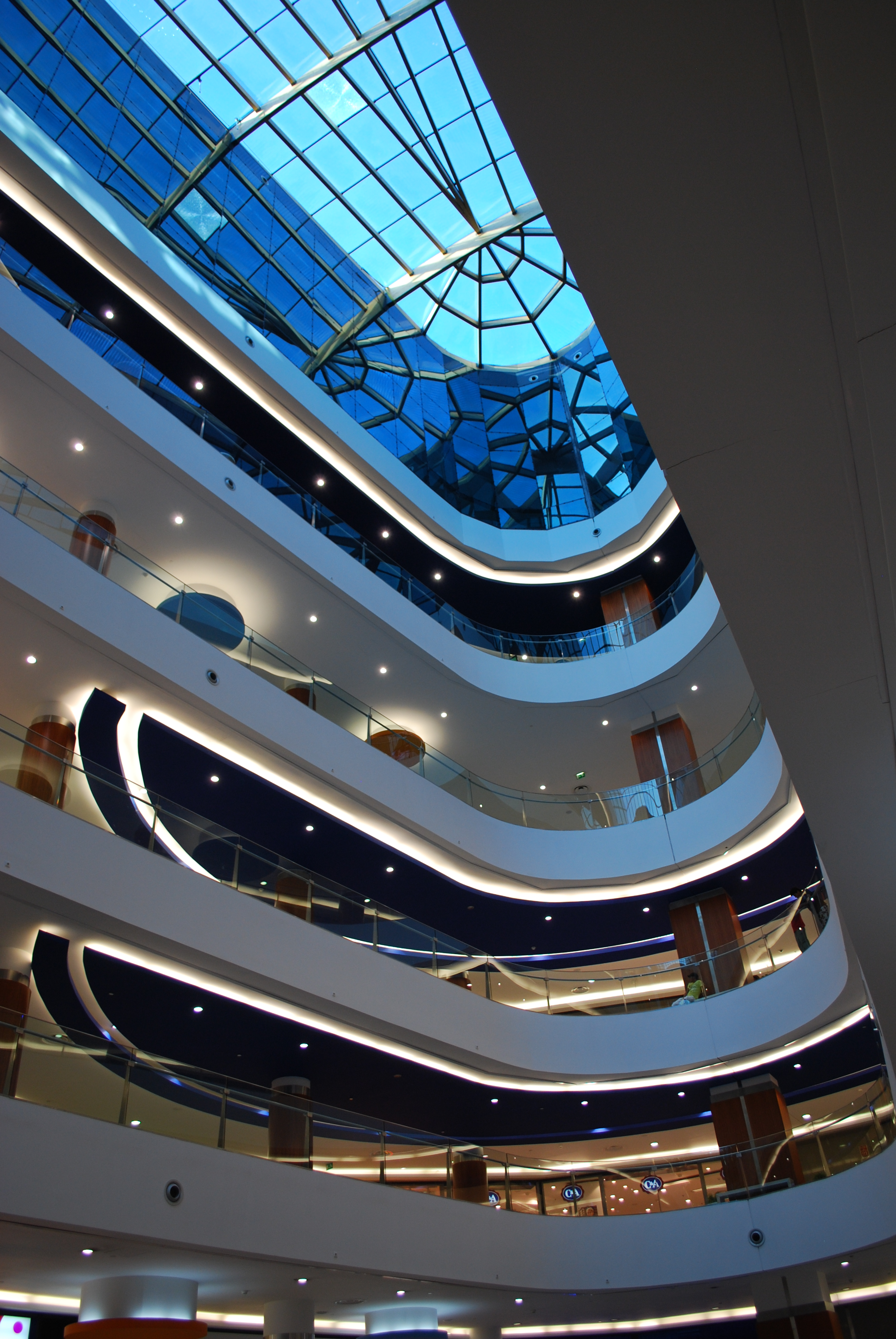
Palácio do Gelo, Viseu

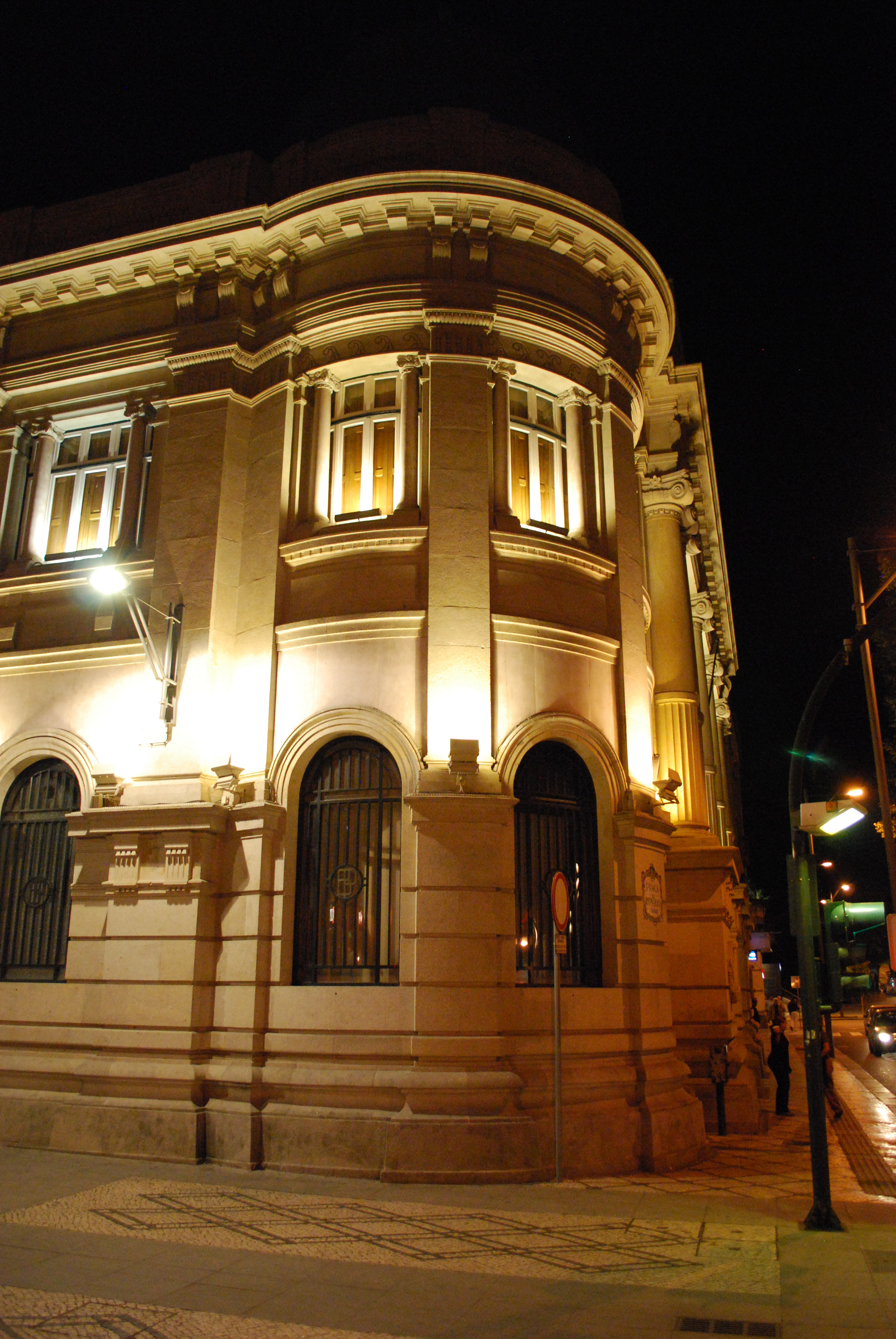
Bank of Portugal agency

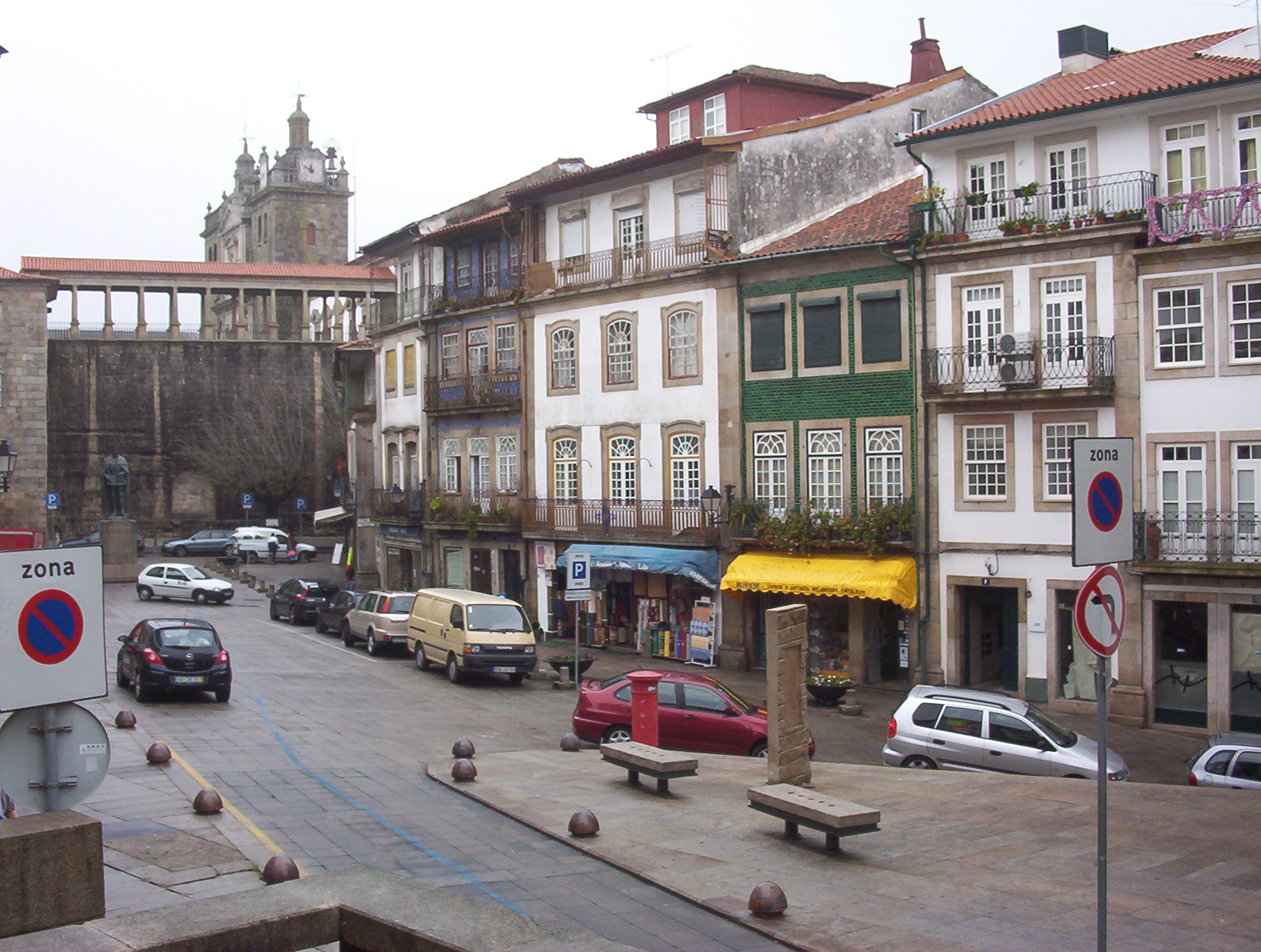
Praça de D.Duarte, in the city centre of Viseu

== Notable citizens ==
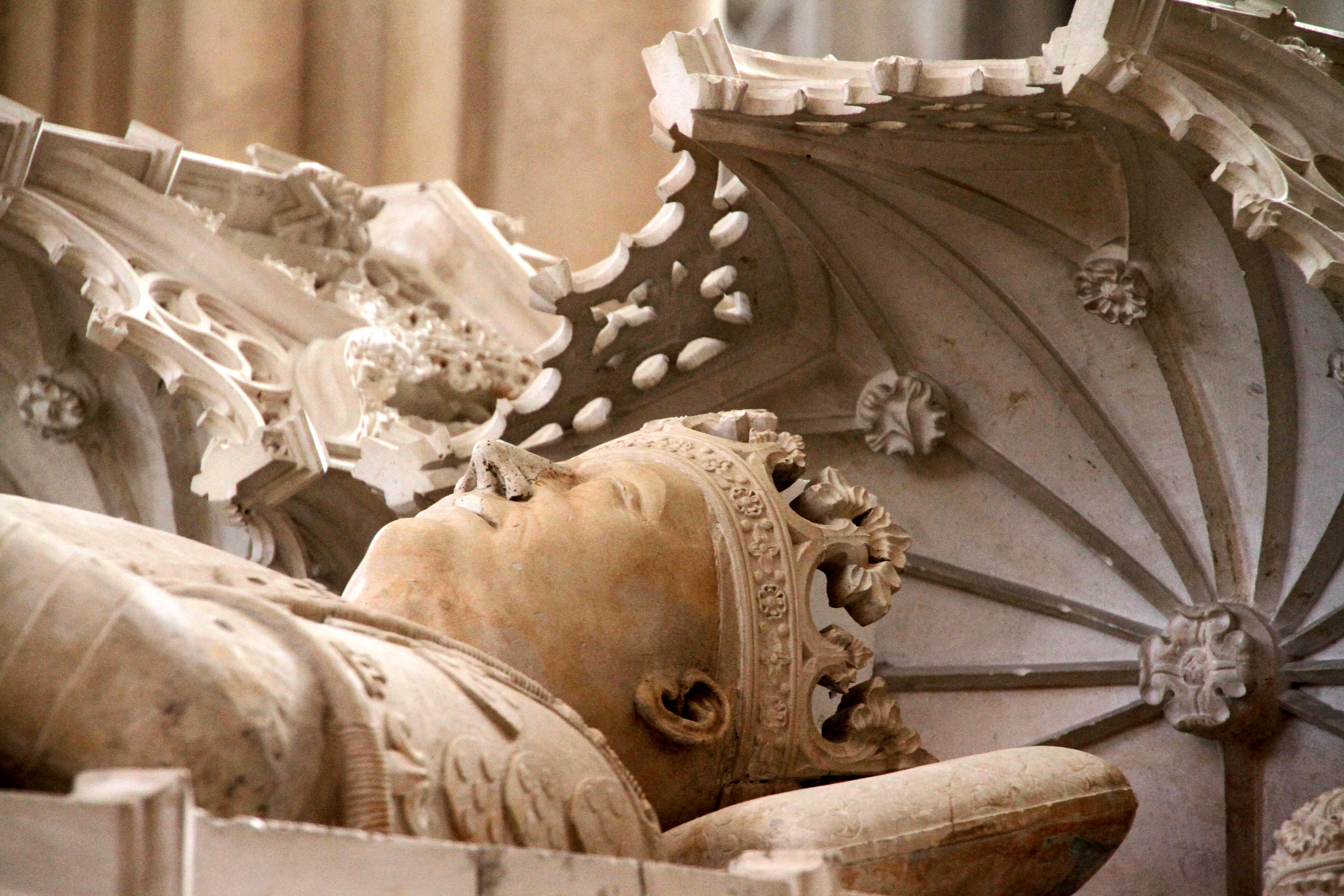
Edward, King of Portugal in Monastery Santa Maria da Vitoria in Batalha

- Edward, King of Portugal (1391–1438), known as Dom Duarte, Portuguese monarch (1433-1438)
- Vasco Fernandes (ca.1475 – ca.1542), better known as Grão Vasco, one of the principal Portuguese Renaissance painters
- João de Barros (ca.1496 – 1570) historian, famous for his Décadas da Ásia, a history of the Portuguese in India, Asia, and southeast Africa.
- Antonio Thomas (ca.1520 – 1590s) a marine and conquistador in service of the Spanish crown.
- Manuel de Almeida (1580–1646) member of the Society of Jesus, missionary to India
- Rita Amada de Jesus (1848-1913), born Rita Lopes de Almeida, beatified religious sister
- Josefa de Oliveira (1853-1909), theatre actress and lyrical singer
- Beatriz Pinheiro (1872–1922) a writer and a pacifist concerned to improve the rights of women.
- Judite Teixeira (1880-1959) a writer of three books of poetry and a book of short stories
- Carlos Branquinho (1902–1973) a Portuguese diplomat, saved the lives of 1,000 Jews in Nazi-occupied Hungary
- Manuel Maria Carrilho (born 1951) a philosopher, academic and politician; Minister of Culture (1995-2000)
- Álvaro Santos Pereira (born 1972) an economist, professor, writer and government minister between 2011 and 2013.
- Nuno Loureiro (1977-2025) a plasma physicist and professor

=== Sport ===
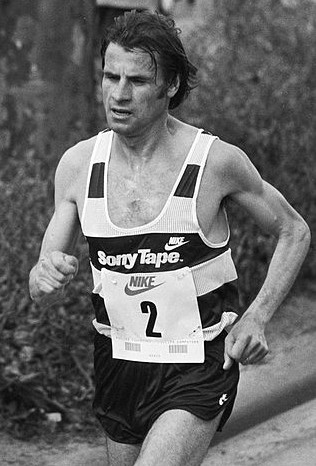
Carlos Lopes, 1985

- Carlos Lopes (born 1947 in Vildemoinhos) a former long-distance runner, won the 1984 Summer Olympics marathon; the first Portuguese Olympic gold medalist.
- Paulo Sousa (born 1970), footballer, Portugal international (51 caps) part of the "Geração de Ouro" and later coach, namely for the Poland national football team.
- Paulo Gomes (born 1975) a retired footballer with 296 club caps
- Bruno Madeira (born 1984) a footballer with over 360 club caps
- Fernando Ferreira (born 1986) a footballer with over 330 club caps
- Tiago Gonçalves (born 1986) a footballer with 247 caps with Académico de Viseu
- Fábio Santos (born 1988) footballer with over 300 club caps, plays for Académico de Viseu
- Neide Simões (born 1988), women's football goalkeeper, Portugal international (60 caps)
- Bruno Loureiro (born 1989) a footballer with over 270 club caps, plays for Académico de Viseu
- André Coelho (born 1993), futsal player, world champion as a Portugal international
- Rui Miguel (born 1983), footballer with over 330 club caps
- João Félix (born 1999), footballer, Portugal international
- António Silva (born 2003), footballer, Portugal international
