= Serra do Caramulo =

Mountain range in Portugal

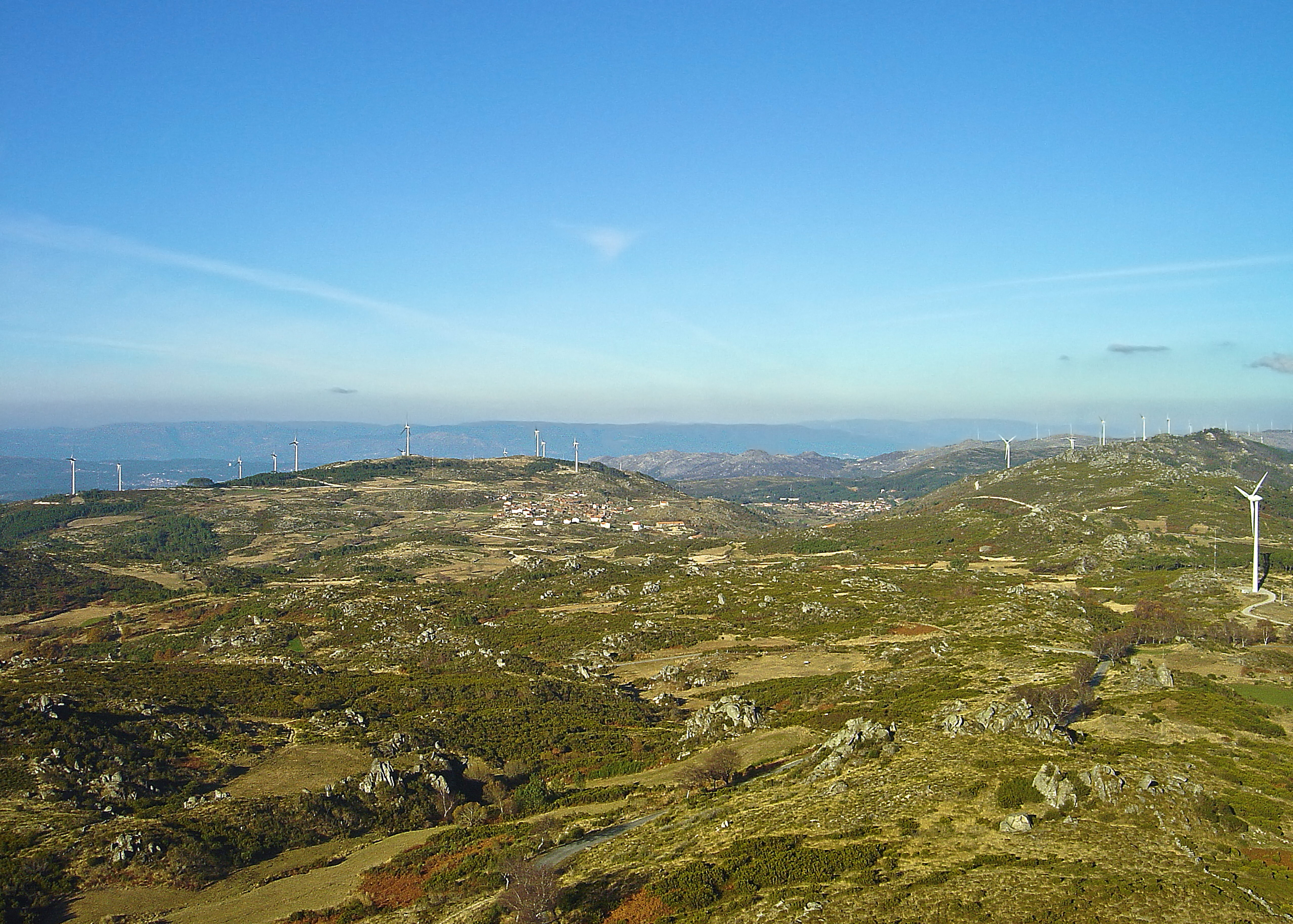

Highest point
- Peak: Caramulinho
- Elevation: 1,076.57 m (3,532.1 ft)
- Coordinates: 40°34′49.6″N 8°10′35″W

Geography
- Location within Portugal
- Country: Portugal
- Region: Centro

Geology
- Rock type(s): Granite, Schist

Serra do Caramulo is a mountain range in Central Portugal. The mountain is part of the intermunicipal community of Viseu Dão Lafões and is populated by villages with granite houses and espigueiros typical of this region. Some traces of Neolithic and Roman occupation, such as the megaliths and stone tracks, can still be found in the range. It has a rich flora, predominated by Genista tridentata and heather and also the rare Rhododendron ponticum.

The Caramulinho is the highest peak of the range where the Atlantic Ocean and Serra da Estrela are visible in the clearest days.

The small locality of Caramulo is also part of the range.

== Climate ==
The range has a warm-summer Mediterranean climate (Köppen: Csb, Thornthwaite: AB1'ra'), with warm, dry summers and cool, rainy winters.

Climate data for Serra do Caramulo, altitude: 810 m (2,660 ft), 1961-1990 normals and extremes
Month	Jan	Feb	Mar	Apr	May	Jun	Jul	Aug	Sep	Oct	Nov	Dec	Year
Record high °C (°F)	17.1 (62.8)	18.8 (65.8)	22.6 (72.7)	26.2 (79.2)	31.5 (88.7)	34.8 (94.6)	36.4 (97.5)	36.8 (98.2)	35.8 (96.4)	30 (86)	23.6 (74.5)	20.0 (68.0)	36.8 (98.2)
Mean daily maximum °C (°F)	9.2 (48.6)	9.9 (49.8)	11.9 (53.4)	13.7 (56.7)	16.7 (62.1)	21.0 (69.8)	24.6 (76.3)	24.7 (76.5)	22.4 (72.3)	17.2 (63.0)	12.2 (54.0)	9.8 (49.6)	16.1 (61.0)
Daily mean °C (°F)	6.2 (43.2)	6.8 (44.2)	8.2 (46.8)	9.7 (49.5)	12.5 (54.5)	16.4 (61.5)	19.5 (67.1)	19.5 (67.1)	17.8 (64.0)	13.7 (56.7)	9.1 (48.4)	6.8 (44.2)	12.2 (53.9)
Mean daily minimum °C (°F)	3.2 (37.8)	3.6 (38.5)	4.5 (40.1)	5.7 (42.3)	8.2 (46.8)	11.8 (53.2)	14.3 (57.7)	14.3 (57.7)	13.3 (55.9)	10.1 (50.2)	6.0 (42.8)	3.9 (39.0)	8.2 (46.8)
Record low °C (°F)	−4.8 (23.4)	−4.2 (24.4)	−4.5 (23.9)	−2.0 (28.4)	0.9 (33.6)	3.6 (38.5)	6.9 (44.4)	7.0 (44.6)	4.5 (40.1)	1.4 (34.5)	−3.6 (25.5)	−7.3 (18.9)	−7.3 (18.9)
Average precipitation mm (inches)	377.1 (14.85)	374.0 (14.72)	219.5 (8.64)	179.8 (7.08)	151.2 (5.95)	94.3 (3.71)	24.0 (0.94)	21.9 (0.86)	94.2 (3.71)	214.9 (8.46)	283.4 (11.16)	303.0 (11.93)	2,337.3 (92.01)
Average precipitation days (≥ 0.1 mm)	16.3	15.3	14.2	13.6	11.6	8.4	3.9	4.0	7.6	11.9	14.8	13.8	135.4
Average snowy days	1.0	0.9	0.7	0.3	0.5	0	0	0	0	0	0.1	0.7	4.2
Average relative humidity (%)	82.5	80.0	73.5	73.5	72	69	61	61	67.5	75	80.5	81.5	73.1
Mean monthly sunshine hours	104	132	168	206	250	266	323	316	214	177	132	128	2,416
Source: Instituto de Meteorologia

Climate data for Serra da Muna, altitude: 628 m (2,060 ft), 1961-1990 normals and extremes
Month	Jan	Feb	Mar	Apr	May	Jun	Jul	Aug	Sep	Oct	Nov	Dec	Year
Record high °C (°F)	—	—	—	—	—	—	—	38.7 (101.7)	—	—	—	—	38.7 (101.7)
Mean daily maximum °C (°F)	10.4 (50.7)	11.4 (52.5)	13.7 (56.7)	15.5 (59.9)	19.0 (66.2)	23.4 (74.1)	27.0 (80.6)	27.3 (81.1)	24.6 (76.3)	18.9 (66.0)	13.6 (56.5)	10.7 (51.3)	18.0 (64.3)
Daily mean °C (°F)	6.7 (44.1)	7.4 (45.3)	9.1 (48.4)	10.6 (51.1)	13.5 (56.3)	17.4 (63.3)	20.2 (68.4)	20.2 (68.4)	18.5 (65.3)	14.2 (57.6)	9.7 (49.5)	7.1 (44.8)	12.9 (55.2)
Mean daily minimum °C (°F)	3.0 (37.4)	3.5 (38.3)	4.4 (39.9)	5.6 (42.1)	8.0 (46.4)	11.4 (52.5)	13.3 (55.9)	13.1 (55.6)	12.5 (54.5)	9.5 (49.1)	5.8 (42.4)	3.6 (38.5)	7.8 (46.1)
Record low °C (°F)	—	—	—	—	—	—	—	—	—	—	—	−7.0 (19.4)	−7.0 (19.4)
Average relative humidity (%) (at 9:00 AM)	85	83	75	73	71	68	65	63	68	76	81	85	74
Source: Instituto de Meteorologia

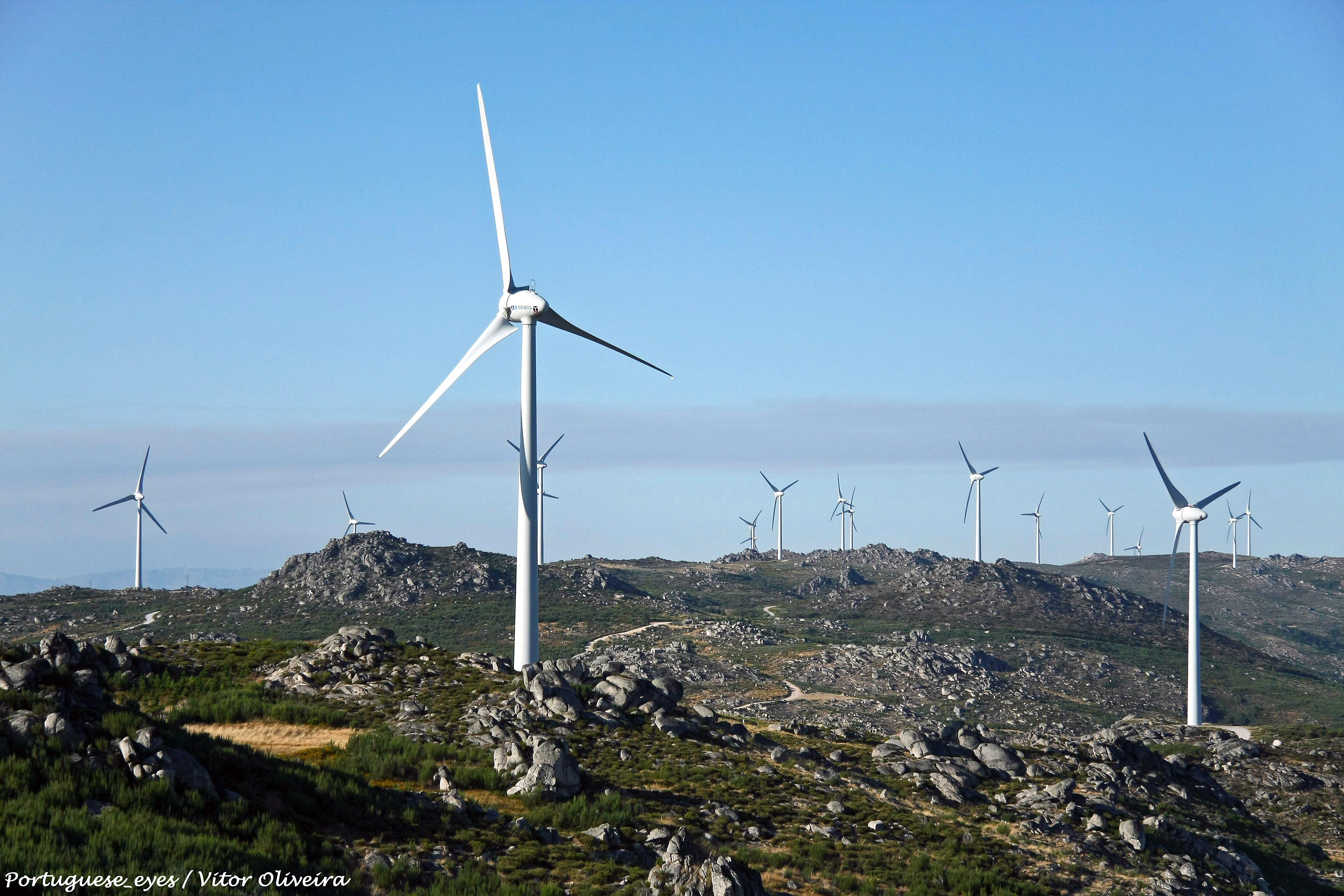
Wind farm

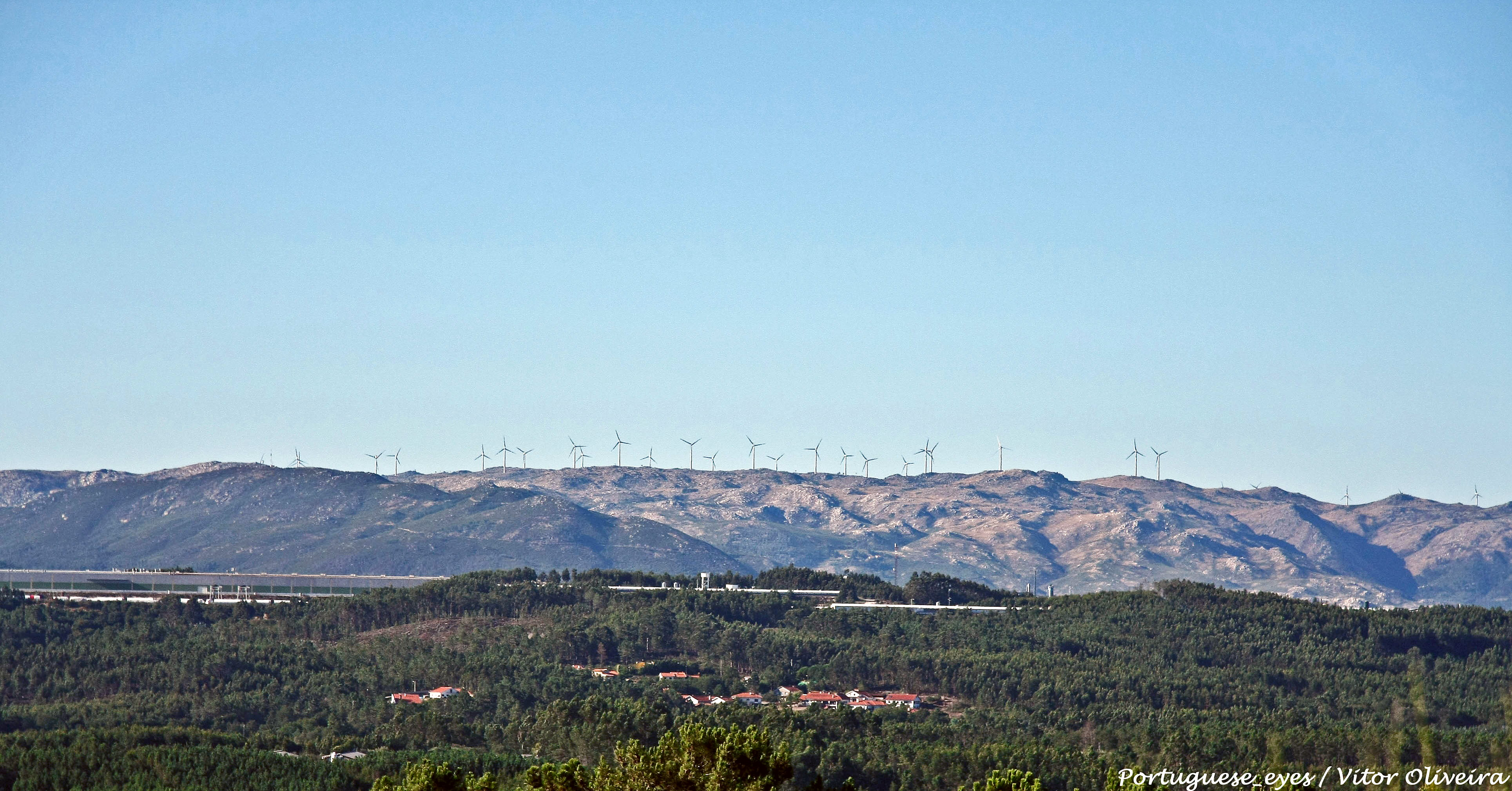
View of the range

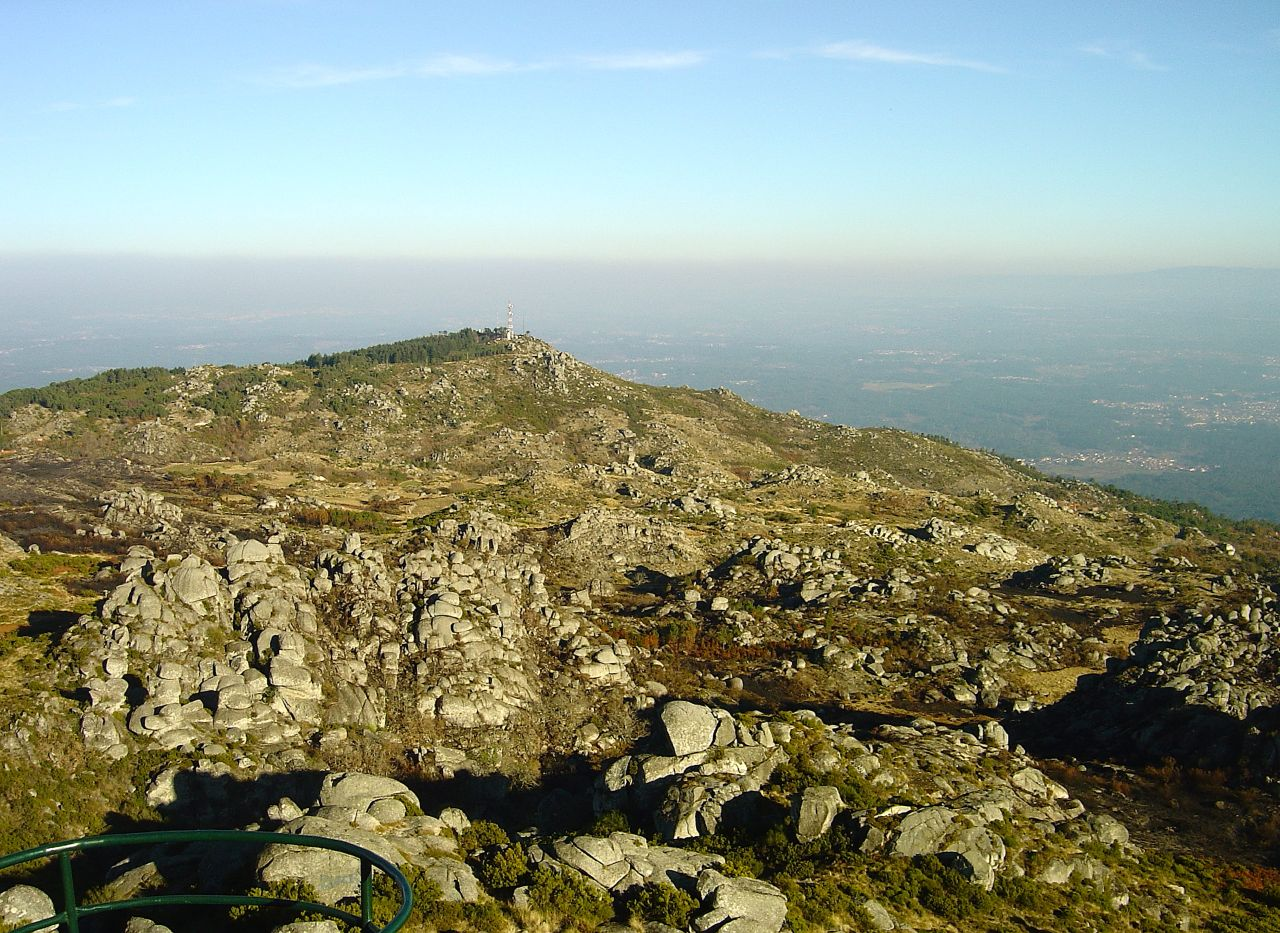
View from Caramulinho

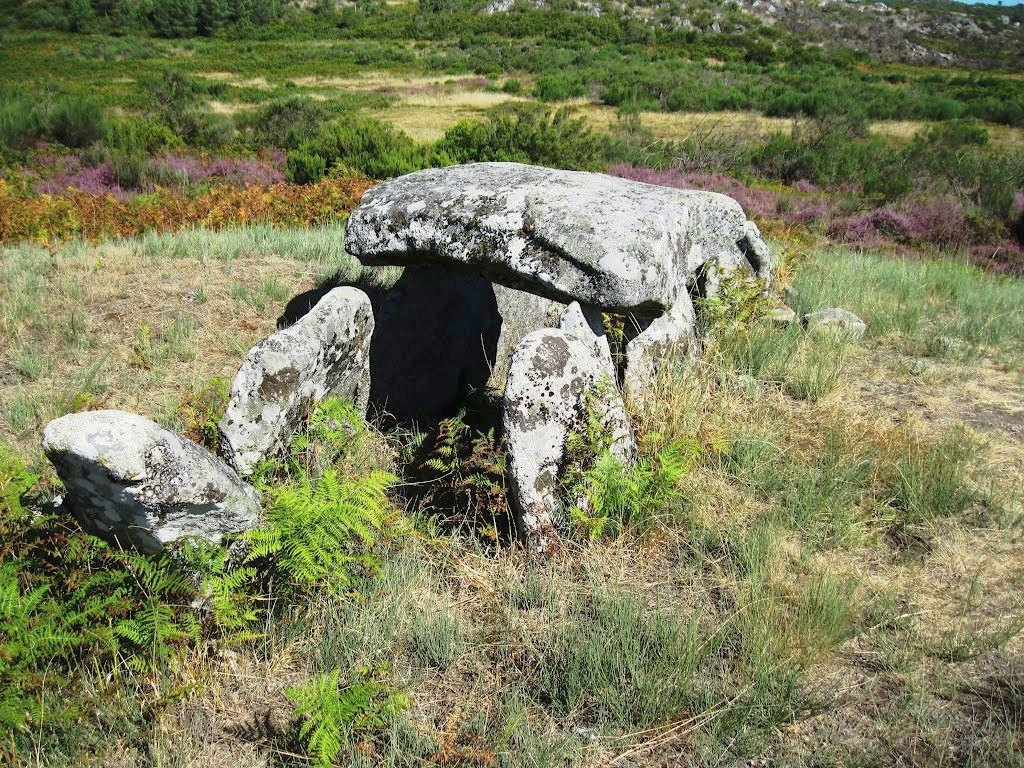
Malhada do Cambarinho Dolmen
