= Caramulo =

Town in Portugal

Coordinates: 40°34′N 8°10′W

Caramulo is a town in Portugal. It is part of the civil parish of Guardão in the municipality of Tondela, Portugal.

In Caramulo is housed one of the most important motor vehicle museums in Portugal. Among the exhibits are some very rare cars, including António de Oliveira Salazar's official state vehicle and the fully Portuguese-built Alba sports car from the 1950s.

The tourism industry in the area has had roots for many years due to Caramulo being renowned for the natural Spa baths and health establishments within an untouched forest setting, ideal for leisure activities such as cycling, walking and sightseeing. Although, of late, further expansion of facilities is taking place to accommodate increased demand.

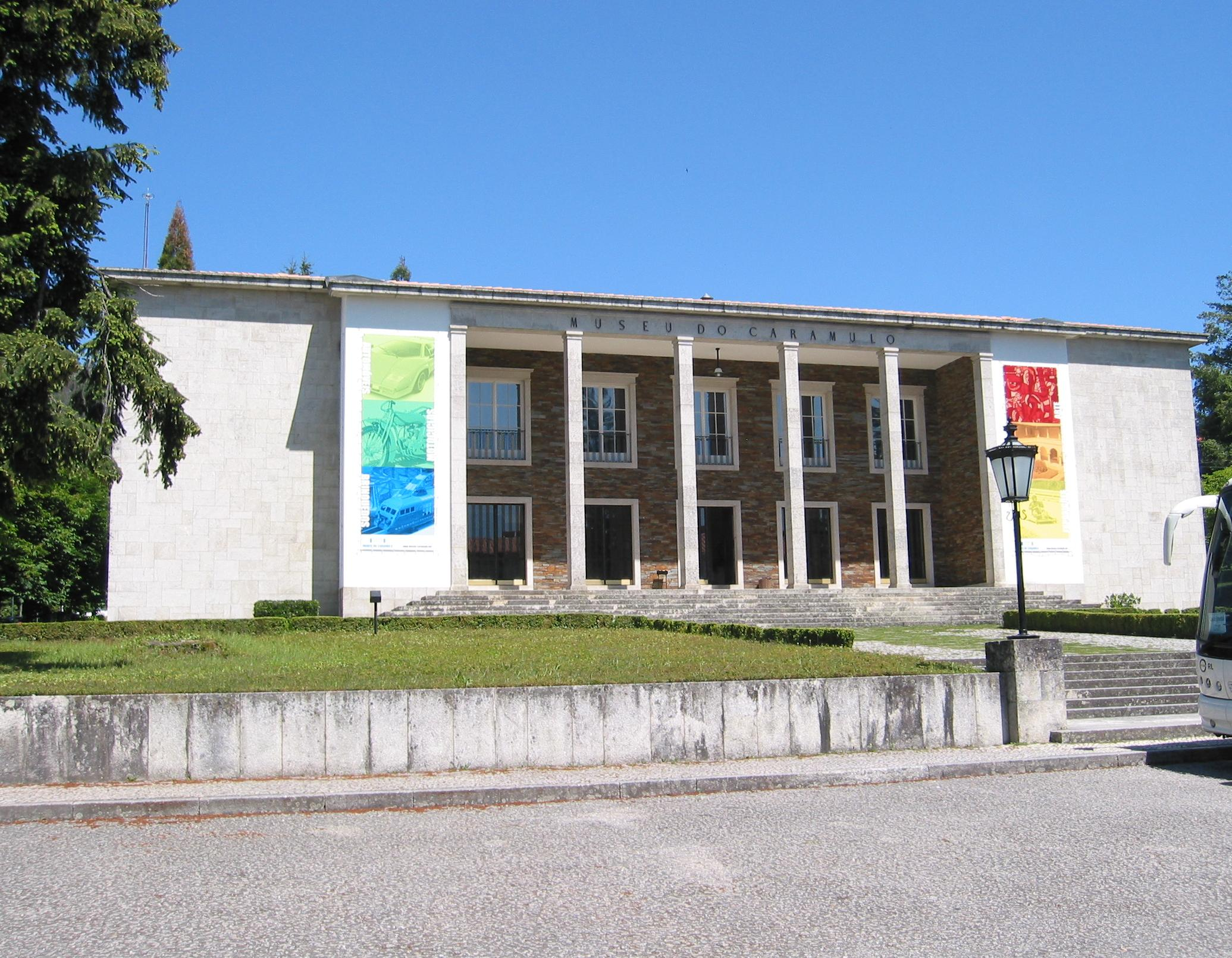
The Caramulo museum front entrance

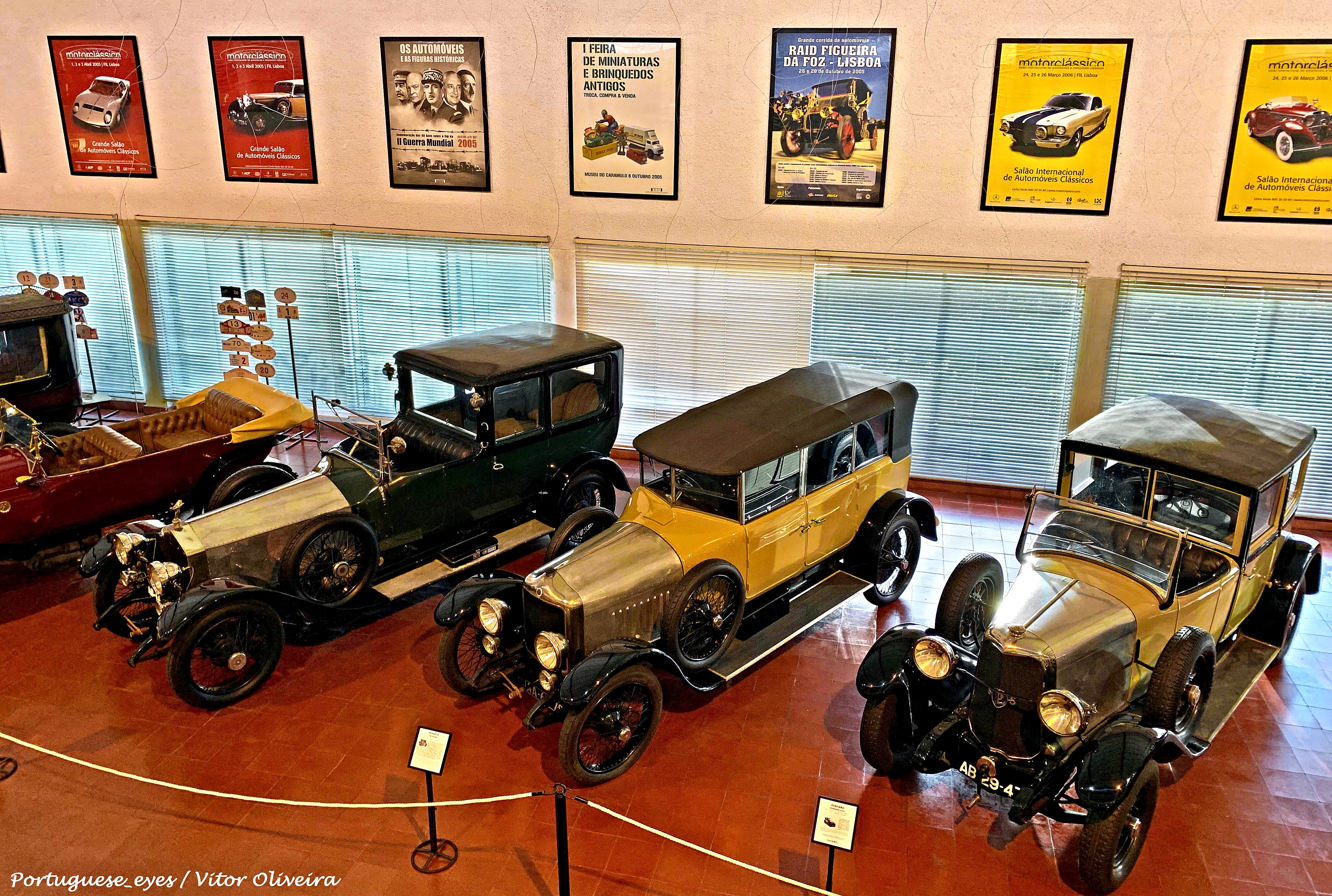
Classical cars in the Caramulo museum
